

335001–335100 

|-bgcolor=#fefefe
| 335001 ||  || — || April 13, 2004 || Kitt Peak || Spacewatch || V || align=right data-sort-value="0.82" | 820 m || 
|-id=002 bgcolor=#d6d6d6
| 335002 ||  || — || April 13, 2004 || Kitt Peak || Spacewatch || — || align=right | 3.7 km || 
|-id=003 bgcolor=#fefefe
| 335003 ||  || — || April 13, 2004 || Kitt Peak || Spacewatch || NYS || align=right data-sort-value="0.61" | 610 m || 
|-id=004 bgcolor=#fefefe
| 335004 ||  || — || April 13, 2004 || Kitt Peak || Spacewatch || V || align=right data-sort-value="0.71" | 710 m || 
|-id=005 bgcolor=#fefefe
| 335005 ||  || — || April 16, 2004 || Socorro || LINEAR || — || align=right | 1.0 km || 
|-id=006 bgcolor=#fefefe
| 335006 ||  || — || April 16, 2004 || Socorro || LINEAR || — || align=right | 1.1 km || 
|-id=007 bgcolor=#fefefe
| 335007 ||  || — || April 19, 2004 || Kitt Peak || Spacewatch || — || align=right data-sort-value="0.97" | 970 m || 
|-id=008 bgcolor=#fefefe
| 335008 ||  || — || April 16, 2004 || Socorro || LINEAR || — || align=right | 1.2 km || 
|-id=009 bgcolor=#fefefe
| 335009 ||  || — || April 20, 2004 || Socorro || LINEAR || NYS || align=right data-sort-value="0.76" | 760 m || 
|-id=010 bgcolor=#fefefe
| 335010 ||  || — || April 21, 2004 || Catalina || CSS || — || align=right | 1.7 km || 
|-id=011 bgcolor=#fefefe
| 335011 ||  || — || April 23, 2004 || Siding Spring || SSS || — || align=right | 1.4 km || 
|-id=012 bgcolor=#fefefe
| 335012 ||  || — || April 25, 2004 || Socorro || LINEAR || — || align=right | 1.2 km || 
|-id=013 bgcolor=#fefefe
| 335013 ||  || — || April 26, 2004 || Mauna Kea || P. A. Wiegert || MAS || align=right data-sort-value="0.68" | 680 m || 
|-id=014 bgcolor=#fefefe
| 335014 || 2004 JJ || — || May 8, 2004 || Wrightwood || J. W. Young || V || align=right data-sort-value="0.68" | 680 m || 
|-id=015 bgcolor=#fefefe
| 335015 ||  || — || May 15, 2004 || Socorro || LINEAR || — || align=right | 1.1 km || 
|-id=016 bgcolor=#FA8072
| 335016 ||  || — || May 17, 2004 || Socorro || LINEAR || — || align=right | 1.4 km || 
|-id=017 bgcolor=#E9E9E9
| 335017 ||  || — || June 11, 2004 || Anderson Mesa || LONEOS || — || align=right | 1.4 km || 
|-id=018 bgcolor=#fefefe
| 335018 ||  || — || July 11, 2004 || Socorro || LINEAR || — || align=right | 1.2 km || 
|-id=019 bgcolor=#fefefe
| 335019 ||  || — || July 11, 2004 || Socorro || LINEAR || H || align=right | 1.1 km || 
|-id=020 bgcolor=#fefefe
| 335020 ||  || — || June 12, 2004 || Siding Spring || SSS || H || align=right data-sort-value="0.85" | 850 m || 
|-id=021 bgcolor=#E9E9E9
| 335021 ||  || — || July 16, 2004 || Socorro || LINEAR || — || align=right | 1.4 km || 
|-id=022 bgcolor=#fefefe
| 335022 ||  || — || July 21, 2004 || Siding Spring || SSS || H || align=right data-sort-value="0.81" | 810 m || 
|-id=023 bgcolor=#fefefe
| 335023 ||  || — || August 3, 2004 || Siding Spring || SSS || H || align=right data-sort-value="0.90" | 900 m || 
|-id=024 bgcolor=#FA8072
| 335024 ||  || — || August 9, 2004 || Socorro || LINEAR || — || align=right data-sort-value="0.79" | 790 m || 
|-id=025 bgcolor=#fefefe
| 335025 ||  || — || August 8, 2004 || Socorro || LINEAR || — || align=right | 1.1 km || 
|-id=026 bgcolor=#E9E9E9
| 335026 ||  || — || August 8, 2004 || Socorro || LINEAR || — || align=right | 1.0 km || 
|-id=027 bgcolor=#fefefe
| 335027 ||  || — || August 9, 2004 || Socorro || LINEAR || H || align=right data-sort-value="0.81" | 810 m || 
|-id=028 bgcolor=#E9E9E9
| 335028 ||  || — || August 11, 2004 || Wrightwood || J. W. Young || — || align=right | 1.0 km || 
|-id=029 bgcolor=#fefefe
| 335029 || 2004 QU || — || August 18, 2004 || Pla D'Arguines || R. Ferrando || H || align=right data-sort-value="0.95" | 950 m || 
|-id=030 bgcolor=#E9E9E9
| 335030 ||  || — || August 21, 2004 || Siding Spring || SSS || — || align=right | 1.1 km || 
|-id=031 bgcolor=#fefefe
| 335031 ||  || — || August 25, 2004 || Socorro || LINEAR || H || align=right data-sort-value="0.97" | 970 m || 
|-id=032 bgcolor=#fefefe
| 335032 ||  || — || August 20, 2004 || Catalina || CSS || H || align=right data-sort-value="0.75" | 750 m || 
|-id=033 bgcolor=#E9E9E9
| 335033 ||  || — || August 21, 2004 || Siding Spring || SSS || — || align=right | 1.2 km || 
|-id=034 bgcolor=#fefefe
| 335034 ||  || — || September 6, 2004 || Socorro || LINEAR || H || align=right data-sort-value="0.99" | 990 m || 
|-id=035 bgcolor=#fefefe
| 335035 ||  || — || September 6, 2004 || Socorro || LINEAR || H || align=right data-sort-value="0.71" | 710 m || 
|-id=036 bgcolor=#fefefe
| 335036 ||  || — || September 6, 2004 || Socorro || LINEAR || H || align=right data-sort-value="0.76" | 760 m || 
|-id=037 bgcolor=#E9E9E9
| 335037 ||  || — || September 6, 2004 || Siding Spring || SSS || critical || align=right data-sort-value="0.98" | 980 m || 
|-id=038 bgcolor=#fefefe
| 335038 ||  || — || September 8, 2004 || Socorro || LINEAR || H || align=right data-sort-value="0.83" | 830 m || 
|-id=039 bgcolor=#E9E9E9
| 335039 ||  || — || September 6, 2004 || Siding Spring || SSS || critical || align=right data-sort-value="0.90" | 900 m || 
|-id=040 bgcolor=#E9E9E9
| 335040 ||  || — || September 7, 2004 || Socorro || LINEAR || — || align=right data-sort-value="0.96" | 960 m || 
|-id=041 bgcolor=#E9E9E9
| 335041 ||  || — || September 8, 2004 || Socorro || LINEAR || AER || align=right | 1.4 km || 
|-id=042 bgcolor=#E9E9E9
| 335042 ||  || — || September 8, 2004 || Socorro || LINEAR || — || align=right | 1.1 km || 
|-id=043 bgcolor=#E9E9E9
| 335043 ||  || — || September 8, 2004 || Palomar || NEAT || — || align=right data-sort-value="0.97" | 970 m || 
|-id=044 bgcolor=#E9E9E9
| 335044 ||  || — || August 25, 2004 || Kitt Peak || Spacewatch || — || align=right | 1.1 km || 
|-id=045 bgcolor=#E9E9E9
| 335045 ||  || — || September 8, 2004 || Palomar || NEAT || EUN || align=right | 1.8 km || 
|-id=046 bgcolor=#E9E9E9
| 335046 ||  || — || September 8, 2004 || Socorro || LINEAR || — || align=right data-sort-value="0.98" | 980 m || 
|-id=047 bgcolor=#E9E9E9
| 335047 ||  || — || September 8, 2004 || Socorro || LINEAR || MAR || align=right | 1.5 km || 
|-id=048 bgcolor=#E9E9E9
| 335048 ||  || — || September 8, 2004 || Palomar || NEAT || MAR || align=right | 1.5 km || 
|-id=049 bgcolor=#E9E9E9
| 335049 ||  || — || September 9, 2004 || Socorro || LINEAR || — || align=right data-sort-value="0.81" | 810 m || 
|-id=050 bgcolor=#E9E9E9
| 335050 ||  || — || September 9, 2004 || Kitt Peak || Spacewatch || — || align=right | 3.9 km || 
|-id=051 bgcolor=#E9E9E9
| 335051 ||  || — || September 10, 2004 || Desert Moon || B. L. Stevens || — || align=right | 1.1 km || 
|-id=052 bgcolor=#FA8072
| 335052 ||  || — || September 11, 2004 || Socorro || LINEAR || — || align=right | 2.7 km || 
|-id=053 bgcolor=#fefefe
| 335053 ||  || — || September 11, 2004 || Socorro || LINEAR || H || align=right data-sort-value="0.87" | 870 m || 
|-id=054 bgcolor=#E9E9E9
| 335054 ||  || — || September 7, 2004 || Palomar || NEAT || — || align=right | 1.1 km || 
|-id=055 bgcolor=#E9E9E9
| 335055 ||  || — || September 8, 2004 || Palomar || NEAT || — || align=right | 1.2 km || 
|-id=056 bgcolor=#E9E9E9
| 335056 ||  || — || September 9, 2004 || Socorro || LINEAR || — || align=right | 1.1 km || 
|-id=057 bgcolor=#E9E9E9
| 335057 ||  || — || September 10, 2004 || Socorro || LINEAR || — || align=right | 1.2 km || 
|-id=058 bgcolor=#E9E9E9
| 335058 ||  || — || September 8, 2004 || Socorro || LINEAR || — || align=right | 1.5 km || 
|-id=059 bgcolor=#E9E9E9
| 335059 ||  || — || September 8, 2004 || Socorro || LINEAR || — || align=right data-sort-value="0.98" | 980 m || 
|-id=060 bgcolor=#E9E9E9
| 335060 ||  || — || September 10, 2004 || Socorro || LINEAR || — || align=right | 1.2 km || 
|-id=061 bgcolor=#E9E9E9
| 335061 ||  || — || September 10, 2004 || Socorro || LINEAR || JUL || align=right | 1.4 km || 
|-id=062 bgcolor=#E9E9E9
| 335062 ||  || — || September 10, 2004 || Socorro || LINEAR || — || align=right | 1.5 km || 
|-id=063 bgcolor=#fefefe
| 335063 ||  || — || September 11, 2004 || Socorro || LINEAR || H || align=right data-sort-value="0.87" | 870 m || 
|-id=064 bgcolor=#E9E9E9
| 335064 ||  || — || September 11, 2004 || Socorro || LINEAR || — || align=right | 2.0 km || 
|-id=065 bgcolor=#E9E9E9
| 335065 ||  || — || September 11, 2004 || Socorro || LINEAR || JUN || align=right | 1.4 km || 
|-id=066 bgcolor=#E9E9E9
| 335066 ||  || — || September 7, 2004 || Socorro || LINEAR || — || align=right | 4.1 km || 
|-id=067 bgcolor=#E9E9E9
| 335067 ||  || — || September 8, 2004 || Palomar || NEAT || — || align=right | 1.4 km || 
|-id=068 bgcolor=#E9E9E9
| 335068 ||  || — || September 6, 2004 || Palomar || NEAT || — || align=right | 1.1 km || 
|-id=069 bgcolor=#E9E9E9
| 335069 ||  || — || August 21, 2004 || Kitt Peak || Spacewatch || — || align=right | 1.3 km || 
|-id=070 bgcolor=#fefefe
| 335070 ||  || — || September 15, 2004 || Socorro || LINEAR || H || align=right data-sort-value="0.65" | 650 m || 
|-id=071 bgcolor=#FA8072
| 335071 ||  || — || September 13, 2004 || Socorro || LINEAR || — || align=right | 2.4 km || 
|-id=072 bgcolor=#E9E9E9
| 335072 ||  || — || September 9, 2004 || Socorro || LINEAR || — || align=right | 1.2 km || 
|-id=073 bgcolor=#E9E9E9
| 335073 ||  || — || September 11, 2004 || Palomar || NEAT || — || align=right | 1.6 km || 
|-id=074 bgcolor=#E9E9E9
| 335074 ||  || — || September 11, 2004 || Socorro || LINEAR || — || align=right data-sort-value="0.93" | 930 m || 
|-id=075 bgcolor=#E9E9E9
| 335075 ||  || — || September 13, 2004 || Socorro || LINEAR || — || align=right | 1.6 km || 
|-id=076 bgcolor=#E9E9E9
| 335076 ||  || — || September 13, 2004 || Socorro || LINEAR || ADE || align=right | 3.4 km || 
|-id=077 bgcolor=#E9E9E9
| 335077 ||  || — || September 13, 2004 || Socorro || LINEAR || — || align=right | 1.3 km || 
|-id=078 bgcolor=#E9E9E9
| 335078 ||  || — || September 15, 2004 || Kitt Peak || Spacewatch || — || align=right data-sort-value="0.55" | 550 m || 
|-id=079 bgcolor=#E9E9E9
| 335079 ||  || — || September 11, 2004 || Palomar || NEAT || — || align=right | 1.1 km || 
|-id=080 bgcolor=#E9E9E9
| 335080 || 2004 SN || — || August 21, 2004 || Goodricke-Pigott || R. A. Tucker || — || align=right | 1.0 km || 
|-id=081 bgcolor=#fefefe
| 335081 ||  || — || September 16, 2004 || Siding Spring || SSS || H || align=right data-sort-value="0.72" | 720 m || 
|-id=082 bgcolor=#E9E9E9
| 335082 ||  || — || September 17, 2004 || Anderson Mesa || LONEOS || — || align=right | 1.1 km || 
|-id=083 bgcolor=#E9E9E9
| 335083 ||  || — || September 16, 2004 || Kitt Peak || Spacewatch || — || align=right data-sort-value="0.88" | 880 m || 
|-id=084 bgcolor=#E9E9E9
| 335084 ||  || — || September 17, 2004 || Kitt Peak || Spacewatch || — || align=right | 1.1 km || 
|-id=085 bgcolor=#E9E9E9
| 335085 ||  || — || September 17, 2004 || Socorro || LINEAR || — || align=right data-sort-value="0.81" | 810 m || 
|-id=086 bgcolor=#E9E9E9
| 335086 ||  || — || September 17, 2004 || Kitt Peak || Spacewatch || — || align=right | 1.2 km || 
|-id=087 bgcolor=#fefefe
| 335087 ||  || — || October 8, 2004 || Socorro || LINEAR || H || align=right | 1.2 km || 
|-id=088 bgcolor=#E9E9E9
| 335088 ||  || — || October 4, 2004 || Kitt Peak || Spacewatch || — || align=right | 1.3 km || 
|-id=089 bgcolor=#E9E9E9
| 335089 ||  || — || October 4, 2004 || Kitt Peak || Spacewatch || — || align=right | 1.2 km || 
|-id=090 bgcolor=#E9E9E9
| 335090 ||  || — || October 4, 2004 || Kitt Peak || Spacewatch || — || align=right | 1.9 km || 
|-id=091 bgcolor=#E9E9E9
| 335091 ||  || — || October 5, 2004 || Anderson Mesa || LONEOS || — || align=right data-sort-value="0.94" | 940 m || 
|-id=092 bgcolor=#E9E9E9
| 335092 ||  || — || October 5, 2004 || Kitt Peak || Spacewatch || RAF || align=right | 1.1 km || 
|-id=093 bgcolor=#E9E9E9
| 335093 ||  || — || October 6, 2004 || Kitt Peak || Spacewatch || — || align=right | 1.2 km || 
|-id=094 bgcolor=#E9E9E9
| 335094 ||  || — || October 4, 2004 || Socorro || LINEAR || — || align=right | 1.4 km || 
|-id=095 bgcolor=#E9E9E9
| 335095 ||  || — || October 5, 2004 || Kitt Peak || Spacewatch || — || align=right | 1.0 km || 
|-id=096 bgcolor=#E9E9E9
| 335096 ||  || — || October 5, 2004 || Kitt Peak || Spacewatch || — || align=right | 1.2 km || 
|-id=097 bgcolor=#E9E9E9
| 335097 ||  || — || October 5, 2004 || Kitt Peak || Spacewatch || — || align=right | 1.2 km || 
|-id=098 bgcolor=#E9E9E9
| 335098 ||  || — || October 5, 2004 || Kitt Peak || Spacewatch || — || align=right | 1.2 km || 
|-id=099 bgcolor=#E9E9E9
| 335099 ||  || — || October 5, 2004 || Kitt Peak || Spacewatch || — || align=right | 1.2 km || 
|-id=100 bgcolor=#E9E9E9
| 335100 ||  || — || October 7, 2004 || Socorro || LINEAR || — || align=right | 1.2 km || 
|}

335101–335200 

|-bgcolor=#E9E9E9
| 335101 ||  || — || October 4, 2004 || Kitt Peak || Spacewatch || — || align=right data-sort-value="0.99" | 990 m || 
|-id=102 bgcolor=#E9E9E9
| 335102 ||  || — || October 6, 2004 || Kitt Peak || Spacewatch || — || align=right | 1.7 km || 
|-id=103 bgcolor=#E9E9E9
| 335103 ||  || — || September 15, 2004 || Kitt Peak || Spacewatch || — || align=right | 1.2 km || 
|-id=104 bgcolor=#E9E9E9
| 335104 ||  || — || October 6, 2004 || Kitt Peak || Spacewatch || WIT || align=right | 1.1 km || 
|-id=105 bgcolor=#E9E9E9
| 335105 ||  || — || October 6, 2004 || Kitt Peak || Spacewatch || — || align=right data-sort-value="0.83" | 830 m || 
|-id=106 bgcolor=#E9E9E9
| 335106 ||  || — || October 6, 2004 || Kitt Peak || Spacewatch || — || align=right | 1.6 km || 
|-id=107 bgcolor=#E9E9E9
| 335107 ||  || — || October 7, 2004 || Kitt Peak || Spacewatch || RAF || align=right data-sort-value="0.78" | 780 m || 
|-id=108 bgcolor=#E9E9E9
| 335108 ||  || — || October 7, 2004 || Kitt Peak || Spacewatch || — || align=right | 1.3 km || 
|-id=109 bgcolor=#E9E9E9
| 335109 ||  || — || October 7, 2004 || Kitt Peak || Spacewatch || — || align=right data-sort-value="0.85" | 850 m || 
|-id=110 bgcolor=#E9E9E9
| 335110 ||  || — || October 7, 2004 || Socorro || LINEAR || — || align=right | 1.2 km || 
|-id=111 bgcolor=#E9E9E9
| 335111 ||  || — || October 7, 2004 || Socorro || LINEAR || — || align=right | 1.8 km || 
|-id=112 bgcolor=#E9E9E9
| 335112 ||  || — || October 7, 2004 || Kitt Peak || Spacewatch || — || align=right | 2.1 km || 
|-id=113 bgcolor=#E9E9E9
| 335113 ||  || — || October 7, 2004 || Kitt Peak || Spacewatch || — || align=right data-sort-value="0.96" | 960 m || 
|-id=114 bgcolor=#E9E9E9
| 335114 ||  || — || October 7, 2004 || Kitt Peak || Spacewatch || — || align=right | 1.1 km || 
|-id=115 bgcolor=#E9E9E9
| 335115 ||  || — || October 7, 2004 || Kitt Peak || Spacewatch || — || align=right | 2.4 km || 
|-id=116 bgcolor=#E9E9E9
| 335116 ||  || — || October 8, 2004 || Kitt Peak || Spacewatch || — || align=right | 2.0 km || 
|-id=117 bgcolor=#E9E9E9
| 335117 ||  || — || October 10, 2004 || Palomar || NEAT || — || align=right | 2.7 km || 
|-id=118 bgcolor=#E9E9E9
| 335118 ||  || — || October 7, 2004 || Kitt Peak || Spacewatch || EUN || align=right | 1.3 km || 
|-id=119 bgcolor=#E9E9E9
| 335119 ||  || — || October 9, 2004 || Socorro || LINEAR || MIS || align=right | 2.5 km || 
|-id=120 bgcolor=#E9E9E9
| 335120 ||  || — || October 9, 2004 || Socorro || LINEAR || — || align=right | 1.0 km || 
|-id=121 bgcolor=#E9E9E9
| 335121 ||  || — || October 9, 2004 || Kitt Peak || Spacewatch || — || align=right | 1.6 km || 
|-id=122 bgcolor=#E9E9E9
| 335122 ||  || — || October 9, 2004 || Kitt Peak || Spacewatch || MAR || align=right | 1.3 km || 
|-id=123 bgcolor=#E9E9E9
| 335123 ||  || — || October 9, 2004 || Kitt Peak || Spacewatch || — || align=right | 1.2 km || 
|-id=124 bgcolor=#E9E9E9
| 335124 ||  || — || October 9, 2004 || Kitt Peak || Spacewatch || — || align=right | 1.5 km || 
|-id=125 bgcolor=#E9E9E9
| 335125 ||  || — || October 7, 2004 || Kitt Peak || Spacewatch || — || align=right data-sort-value="0.97" | 970 m || 
|-id=126 bgcolor=#E9E9E9
| 335126 ||  || — || October 8, 2004 || Socorro || LINEAR || JUN || align=right | 1.3 km || 
|-id=127 bgcolor=#E9E9E9
| 335127 ||  || — || October 9, 2004 || Socorro || LINEAR || — || align=right | 1.0 km || 
|-id=128 bgcolor=#E9E9E9
| 335128 ||  || — || October 10, 2004 || Kitt Peak || Spacewatch || — || align=right | 2.0 km || 
|-id=129 bgcolor=#E9E9E9
| 335129 ||  || — || October 8, 2004 || Socorro || LINEAR || ADE || align=right | 4.5 km || 
|-id=130 bgcolor=#E9E9E9
| 335130 ||  || — || October 11, 2004 || Kitt Peak || Spacewatch || — || align=right | 1.5 km || 
|-id=131 bgcolor=#E9E9E9
| 335131 ||  || — || October 12, 2004 || Kitt Peak || Spacewatch || — || align=right data-sort-value="0.97" | 970 m || 
|-id=132 bgcolor=#E9E9E9
| 335132 ||  || — || October 15, 2004 || Haleakala || NEAT || — || align=right | 1.1 km || 
|-id=133 bgcolor=#E9E9E9
| 335133 ||  || — || October 7, 2004 || Kitt Peak || Spacewatch || EUN || align=right | 1.7 km || 
|-id=134 bgcolor=#E9E9E9
| 335134 ||  || — || October 18, 2004 || Socorro || LINEAR || — || align=right | 1.2 km || 
|-id=135 bgcolor=#fefefe
| 335135 ||  || — || October 16, 2004 || Socorro || LINEAR || H || align=right data-sort-value="0.92" | 920 m || 
|-id=136 bgcolor=#E9E9E9
| 335136 ||  || — || November 3, 2004 || Anderson Mesa || LONEOS || — || align=right | 2.1 km || 
|-id=137 bgcolor=#E9E9E9
| 335137 ||  || — || November 4, 2004 || Catalina || CSS || — || align=right | 2.1 km || 
|-id=138 bgcolor=#E9E9E9
| 335138 ||  || — || November 5, 2004 || Palomar || NEAT || — || align=right | 1.7 km || 
|-id=139 bgcolor=#E9E9E9
| 335139 ||  || — || November 4, 2004 || Catalina || CSS || — || align=right | 1.3 km || 
|-id=140 bgcolor=#E9E9E9
| 335140 ||  || — || November 5, 2004 || Palomar || NEAT || EUN || align=right | 1.4 km || 
|-id=141 bgcolor=#E9E9E9
| 335141 ||  || — || November 4, 2004 || Kitt Peak || Spacewatch || — || align=right | 1.5 km || 
|-id=142 bgcolor=#E9E9E9
| 335142 ||  || — || November 7, 2004 || Socorro || LINEAR || — || align=right | 1.4 km || 
|-id=143 bgcolor=#E9E9E9
| 335143 ||  || — || November 2, 2004 || Anderson Mesa || LONEOS || — || align=right | 1.1 km || 
|-id=144 bgcolor=#E9E9E9
| 335144 ||  || — || November 9, 2004 || Catalina || CSS || — || align=right | 1.3 km || 
|-id=145 bgcolor=#E9E9E9
| 335145 ||  || — || November 11, 2004 || Kitt Peak || Spacewatch || — || align=right | 2.5 km || 
|-id=146 bgcolor=#E9E9E9
| 335146 ||  || — || November 19, 2004 || Anderson Mesa || LONEOS || JUN || align=right | 1.1 km || 
|-id=147 bgcolor=#E9E9E9
| 335147 ||  || — || December 2, 2004 || Catalina || CSS || — || align=right | 1.5 km || 
|-id=148 bgcolor=#E9E9E9
| 335148 ||  || — || December 9, 2004 || Kitt Peak || Spacewatch || — || align=right | 1.8 km || 
|-id=149 bgcolor=#fefefe
| 335149 ||  || — || December 9, 2004 || Socorro || LINEAR || — || align=right | 1.1 km || 
|-id=150 bgcolor=#E9E9E9
| 335150 ||  || — || December 9, 2004 || Catalina || CSS || — || align=right | 2.3 km || 
|-id=151 bgcolor=#E9E9E9
| 335151 ||  || — || December 8, 2004 || Socorro || LINEAR || — || align=right | 2.1 km || 
|-id=152 bgcolor=#E9E9E9
| 335152 ||  || — || December 11, 2004 || Socorro || LINEAR || JUN || align=right | 1.2 km || 
|-id=153 bgcolor=#E9E9E9
| 335153 ||  || — || December 10, 2004 || Hormersdorf || Hormersdorf Obs. || — || align=right | 1.7 km || 
|-id=154 bgcolor=#E9E9E9
| 335154 ||  || — || December 10, 2004 || Kitt Peak || Spacewatch || — || align=right | 2.2 km || 
|-id=155 bgcolor=#E9E9E9
| 335155 ||  || — || December 14, 2004 || Hormersdorf || Hormersdorf Obs. || — || align=right | 3.0 km || 
|-id=156 bgcolor=#E9E9E9
| 335156 ||  || — || December 2, 2004 || Kitt Peak || Spacewatch || — || align=right | 3.4 km || 
|-id=157 bgcolor=#E9E9E9
| 335157 ||  || — || December 13, 2004 || Socorro || LINEAR || — || align=right | 2.4 km || 
|-id=158 bgcolor=#E9E9E9
| 335158 ||  || — || December 11, 2004 || Kitt Peak || Spacewatch || — || align=right | 1.9 km || 
|-id=159 bgcolor=#E9E9E9
| 335159 ||  || — || December 11, 2004 || Kitt Peak || Spacewatch || — || align=right | 1.1 km || 
|-id=160 bgcolor=#E9E9E9
| 335160 ||  || — || December 11, 2004 || Kitt Peak || Spacewatch || — || align=right | 1.7 km || 
|-id=161 bgcolor=#E9E9E9
| 335161 ||  || — || December 11, 2004 || Socorro || LINEAR || — || align=right | 2.3 km || 
|-id=162 bgcolor=#E9E9E9
| 335162 ||  || — || October 23, 2004 || Kitt Peak || Spacewatch || — || align=right | 2.0 km || 
|-id=163 bgcolor=#E9E9E9
| 335163 ||  || — || December 14, 2004 || Anderson Mesa || LONEOS || PAL || align=right | 2.9 km || 
|-id=164 bgcolor=#E9E9E9
| 335164 ||  || — || December 11, 2004 || Socorro || LINEAR || — || align=right | 2.7 km || 
|-id=165 bgcolor=#E9E9E9
| 335165 ||  || — || December 12, 2004 || Kitt Peak || Spacewatch || HNA || align=right | 2.7 km || 
|-id=166 bgcolor=#E9E9E9
| 335166 ||  || — || December 11, 2004 || Socorro || LINEAR || — || align=right | 2.8 km || 
|-id=167 bgcolor=#E9E9E9
| 335167 ||  || — || December 15, 2004 || Kitt Peak || Spacewatch || — || align=right | 1.5 km || 
|-id=168 bgcolor=#E9E9E9
| 335168 ||  || — || December 11, 2004 || Calvin-Rehoboth || L. A. Molnar || — || align=right | 2.0 km || 
|-id=169 bgcolor=#E9E9E9
| 335169 ||  || — || December 10, 2004 || Kitt Peak || Spacewatch || — || align=right | 2.0 km || 
|-id=170 bgcolor=#E9E9E9
| 335170 ||  || — || December 10, 2004 || Campo Imperatore || CINEOS || — || align=right | 2.7 km || 
|-id=171 bgcolor=#E9E9E9
| 335171 ||  || — || December 16, 2004 || Anderson Mesa || LONEOS || — || align=right | 1.4 km || 
|-id=172 bgcolor=#E9E9E9
| 335172 ||  || — || December 18, 2004 || Mount Lemmon || Mount Lemmon Survey || MIS || align=right | 3.0 km || 
|-id=173 bgcolor=#E9E9E9
| 335173 ||  || — || December 18, 2004 || Mount Lemmon || Mount Lemmon Survey || VIB || align=right | 2.8 km || 
|-id=174 bgcolor=#E9E9E9
| 335174 ||  || — || January 11, 2005 || Socorro || LINEAR || — || align=right | 3.0 km || 
|-id=175 bgcolor=#E9E9E9
| 335175 ||  || — || January 13, 2005 || Kitt Peak || Spacewatch || MRX || align=right | 1.4 km || 
|-id=176 bgcolor=#E9E9E9
| 335176 ||  || — || January 11, 2005 || Socorro || LINEAR || — || align=right | 3.1 km || 
|-id=177 bgcolor=#E9E9E9
| 335177 ||  || — || January 15, 2005 || Kitt Peak || Spacewatch || AST || align=right | 1.9 km || 
|-id=178 bgcolor=#C2FFFF
| 335178 ||  || — || January 13, 2005 || Kitt Peak || Spacewatch || L5 || align=right | 9.4 km || 
|-id=179 bgcolor=#E9E9E9
| 335179 ||  || — || January 15, 2005 || Kitt Peak || Spacewatch || — || align=right | 3.2 km || 
|-id=180 bgcolor=#E9E9E9
| 335180 ||  || — || January 16, 2005 || Socorro || LINEAR || ADE || align=right | 3.6 km || 
|-id=181 bgcolor=#E9E9E9
| 335181 ||  || — || January 16, 2005 || Socorro || LINEAR || — || align=right | 1.7 km || 
|-id=182 bgcolor=#d6d6d6
| 335182 ||  || — || January 16, 2005 || Kitt Peak || Spacewatch || — || align=right | 3.8 km || 
|-id=183 bgcolor=#E9E9E9
| 335183 ||  || — || January 18, 2005 || Catalina || CSS || — || align=right | 3.0 km || 
|-id=184 bgcolor=#C2FFFF
| 335184 ||  || — || January 16, 2005 || Kitt Peak || Spacewatch || L5 || align=right | 11 km || 
|-id=185 bgcolor=#E9E9E9
| 335185 ||  || — || February 1, 2005 || Kitt Peak || Spacewatch || PAL || align=right | 2.6 km || 
|-id=186 bgcolor=#C2FFFF
| 335186 ||  || — || February 2, 2005 || Kitt Peak || Spacewatch || L5 || align=right | 15 km || 
|-id=187 bgcolor=#d6d6d6
| 335187 ||  || — || February 2, 2005 || Socorro || LINEAR || — || align=right | 3.3 km || 
|-id=188 bgcolor=#d6d6d6
| 335188 ||  || — || February 2, 2005 || Socorro || LINEAR || — || align=right | 2.5 km || 
|-id=189 bgcolor=#d6d6d6
| 335189 ||  || — || February 9, 2005 || Kitt Peak || Spacewatch || — || align=right | 3.7 km || 
|-id=190 bgcolor=#d6d6d6
| 335190 ||  || — || February 14, 2005 || Catalina || CSS || EUP || align=right | 4.3 km || 
|-id=191 bgcolor=#d6d6d6
| 335191 ||  || — || March 1, 2005 || Goodricke-Pigott || R. A. Tucker || — || align=right | 2.7 km || 
|-id=192 bgcolor=#d6d6d6
| 335192 ||  || — || March 3, 2005 || Junk Bond || Junk Bond Obs. || — || align=right | 2.8 km || 
|-id=193 bgcolor=#d6d6d6
| 335193 ||  || — || March 4, 2005 || Mount Lemmon || Mount Lemmon Survey || — || align=right | 4.8 km || 
|-id=194 bgcolor=#d6d6d6
| 335194 ||  || — || March 3, 2005 || Kitt Peak || Spacewatch || — || align=right | 2.8 km || 
|-id=195 bgcolor=#d6d6d6
| 335195 ||  || — || March 4, 2005 || Kitt Peak || Spacewatch || — || align=right | 3.1 km || 
|-id=196 bgcolor=#fefefe
| 335196 ||  || — || March 4, 2005 || Socorro || LINEAR || — || align=right data-sort-value="0.73" | 730 m || 
|-id=197 bgcolor=#d6d6d6
| 335197 ||  || — || March 4, 2005 || Catalina || CSS || — || align=right | 2.6 km || 
|-id=198 bgcolor=#d6d6d6
| 335198 ||  || — || March 8, 2005 || Kitt Peak || Spacewatch || — || align=right | 3.5 km || 
|-id=199 bgcolor=#d6d6d6
| 335199 ||  || — || March 8, 2005 || Kitt Peak || Spacewatch || — || align=right | 3.8 km || 
|-id=200 bgcolor=#E9E9E9
| 335200 ||  || — || March 8, 2005 || Socorro || LINEAR || JUN || align=right | 1.3 km || 
|}

335201–335300 

|-bgcolor=#d6d6d6
| 335201 ||  || — || March 6, 2005 || Ottmarsheim || Ottmarsheim Obs. || EOS || align=right | 2.6 km || 
|-id=202 bgcolor=#E9E9E9
| 335202 ||  || — || March 9, 2005 || Mount Lemmon || Mount Lemmon Survey || — || align=right | 2.5 km || 
|-id=203 bgcolor=#d6d6d6
| 335203 ||  || — || March 9, 2005 || Socorro || LINEAR || EUP || align=right | 4.2 km || 
|-id=204 bgcolor=#d6d6d6
| 335204 ||  || — || March 10, 2005 || Catalina || CSS || — || align=right | 4.0 km || 
|-id=205 bgcolor=#fefefe
| 335205 ||  || — || March 10, 2005 || Mount Lemmon || Mount Lemmon Survey || — || align=right data-sort-value="0.71" | 710 m || 
|-id=206 bgcolor=#d6d6d6
| 335206 ||  || — || March 10, 2005 || Kitt Peak || Spacewatch || — || align=right | 3.0 km || 
|-id=207 bgcolor=#fefefe
| 335207 ||  || — || March 10, 2005 || Mount Lemmon || Mount Lemmon Survey || — || align=right data-sort-value="0.68" | 680 m || 
|-id=208 bgcolor=#d6d6d6
| 335208 ||  || — || March 12, 2005 || Socorro || LINEAR || EUP || align=right | 6.2 km || 
|-id=209 bgcolor=#d6d6d6
| 335209 ||  || — || March 8, 2005 || Kitt Peak || Spacewatch || — || align=right | 3.3 km || 
|-id=210 bgcolor=#d6d6d6
| 335210 ||  || — || March 9, 2005 || Anderson Mesa || LONEOS || — || align=right | 2.9 km || 
|-id=211 bgcolor=#d6d6d6
| 335211 ||  || — || March 10, 2005 || Mount Lemmon || Mount Lemmon Survey || EOS || align=right | 2.5 km || 
|-id=212 bgcolor=#d6d6d6
| 335212 ||  || — || March 9, 2005 || Mount Lemmon || Mount Lemmon Survey || — || align=right | 2.5 km || 
|-id=213 bgcolor=#d6d6d6
| 335213 ||  || — || March 10, 2005 || Catalina || CSS || — || align=right | 4.8 km || 
|-id=214 bgcolor=#d6d6d6
| 335214 ||  || — || March 10, 2005 || Anderson Mesa || LONEOS || — || align=right | 4.1 km || 
|-id=215 bgcolor=#d6d6d6
| 335215 ||  || — || March 11, 2005 || Socorro || LINEAR || — || align=right | 5.4 km || 
|-id=216 bgcolor=#d6d6d6
| 335216 ||  || — || March 8, 2005 || Socorro || LINEAR || EUP || align=right | 5.4 km || 
|-id=217 bgcolor=#d6d6d6
| 335217 ||  || — || March 17, 2005 || Mount Lemmon || Mount Lemmon Survey || EOS || align=right | 2.2 km || 
|-id=218 bgcolor=#d6d6d6
| 335218 ||  || — || April 1, 2005 || Kitt Peak || Spacewatch || HYG || align=right | 3.0 km || 
|-id=219 bgcolor=#fefefe
| 335219 ||  || — || April 1, 2005 || Anderson Mesa || LONEOS || — || align=right data-sort-value="0.81" | 810 m || 
|-id=220 bgcolor=#FA8072
| 335220 ||  || — || April 2, 2005 || Palomar || NEAT || — || align=right data-sort-value="0.78" | 780 m || 
|-id=221 bgcolor=#d6d6d6
| 335221 ||  || — || April 4, 2005 || Kitt Peak || Spacewatch || — || align=right | 3.9 km || 
|-id=222 bgcolor=#d6d6d6
| 335222 ||  || — || April 3, 2005 || Socorro || LINEAR || — || align=right | 5.0 km || 
|-id=223 bgcolor=#d6d6d6
| 335223 ||  || — || April 5, 2005 || Mount Lemmon || Mount Lemmon Survey || — || align=right | 3.3 km || 
|-id=224 bgcolor=#fefefe
| 335224 ||  || — || April 5, 2005 || Mount Lemmon || Mount Lemmon Survey || FLO || align=right data-sort-value="0.52" | 520 m || 
|-id=225 bgcolor=#d6d6d6
| 335225 ||  || — || April 4, 2005 || Catalina || CSS || — || align=right | 3.8 km || 
|-id=226 bgcolor=#d6d6d6
| 335226 ||  || — || April 4, 2005 || Kitt Peak || Spacewatch || — || align=right | 2.4 km || 
|-id=227 bgcolor=#d6d6d6
| 335227 ||  || — || April 5, 2005 || Mount Lemmon || Mount Lemmon Survey || — || align=right | 3.6 km || 
|-id=228 bgcolor=#d6d6d6
| 335228 ||  || — || April 9, 2005 || Kitt Peak || Spacewatch || — || align=right | 4.0 km || 
|-id=229 bgcolor=#fefefe
| 335229 ||  || — || April 10, 2005 || Mount Lemmon || Mount Lemmon Survey || — || align=right data-sort-value="0.88" | 880 m || 
|-id=230 bgcolor=#d6d6d6
| 335230 ||  || — || April 9, 2005 || Mount Lemmon || Mount Lemmon Survey || — || align=right | 3.7 km || 
|-id=231 bgcolor=#d6d6d6
| 335231 ||  || — || April 10, 2005 || Kitt Peak || Spacewatch || — || align=right | 4.0 km || 
|-id=232 bgcolor=#d6d6d6
| 335232 ||  || — || April 12, 2005 || Kitt Peak || Spacewatch || — || align=right | 3.9 km || 
|-id=233 bgcolor=#fefefe
| 335233 ||  || — || April 10, 2005 || Kitt Peak || Spacewatch || — || align=right data-sort-value="0.59" | 590 m || 
|-id=234 bgcolor=#d6d6d6
| 335234 ||  || — || April 13, 2005 || Catalina || CSS || — || align=right | 3.1 km || 
|-id=235 bgcolor=#fefefe
| 335235 ||  || — || April 12, 2005 || Kitt Peak || Spacewatch || — || align=right data-sort-value="0.79" | 790 m || 
|-id=236 bgcolor=#d6d6d6
| 335236 ||  || — || April 12, 2005 || Kitt Peak || M. W. Buie || — || align=right | 2.0 km || 
|-id=237 bgcolor=#d6d6d6
| 335237 ||  || — || April 10, 2005 || Kitt Peak || M. W. Buie || KOR || align=right | 1.4 km || 
|-id=238 bgcolor=#d6d6d6
| 335238 ||  || — || April 10, 2005 || Catalina || CSS || — || align=right | 4.2 km || 
|-id=239 bgcolor=#d6d6d6
| 335239 ||  || — || April 16, 2005 || Kitt Peak || Spacewatch || EOS || align=right | 2.3 km || 
|-id=240 bgcolor=#d6d6d6
| 335240 ||  || — || May 8, 2005 || Mount Lemmon || Mount Lemmon Survey || EOS || align=right | 2.8 km || 
|-id=241 bgcolor=#fefefe
| 335241 ||  || — || May 8, 2005 || Kitt Peak || Spacewatch || — || align=right data-sort-value="0.73" | 730 m || 
|-id=242 bgcolor=#d6d6d6
| 335242 ||  || — || April 17, 2005 || Kitt Peak || Spacewatch || — || align=right | 3.3 km || 
|-id=243 bgcolor=#d6d6d6
| 335243 ||  || — || May 11, 2005 || Palomar || NEAT || — || align=right | 4.4 km || 
|-id=244 bgcolor=#d6d6d6
| 335244 ||  || — || May 17, 2005 || Mount Lemmon || Mount Lemmon Survey || — || align=right | 4.5 km || 
|-id=245 bgcolor=#fefefe
| 335245 ||  || — || May 3, 2005 || Kitt Peak || Spacewatch || — || align=right data-sort-value="0.77" | 770 m || 
|-id=246 bgcolor=#d6d6d6
| 335246 ||  || — || June 1, 2005 || Mount Lemmon || Mount Lemmon Survey || — || align=right | 3.5 km || 
|-id=247 bgcolor=#fefefe
| 335247 || 2005 LZ || — || June 1, 2005 || Reedy Creek || J. Broughton || FLO || align=right data-sort-value="0.71" | 710 m || 
|-id=248 bgcolor=#fefefe
| 335248 ||  || — || June 4, 2005 || Goodricke-Pigott || R. A. Tucker || — || align=right | 1.7 km || 
|-id=249 bgcolor=#fefefe
| 335249 ||  || — || June 10, 2005 || Kitt Peak || Spacewatch || FLO || align=right data-sort-value="0.53" | 530 m || 
|-id=250 bgcolor=#fefefe
| 335250 ||  || — || June 12, 2005 || Kitt Peak || Spacewatch || FLO || align=right data-sort-value="0.56" | 560 m || 
|-id=251 bgcolor=#fefefe
| 335251 ||  || — || June 14, 2005 || Mount Lemmon || Mount Lemmon Survey || — || align=right data-sort-value="0.68" | 680 m || 
|-id=252 bgcolor=#fefefe
| 335252 ||  || — || June 15, 2005 || Mount Lemmon || Mount Lemmon Survey || — || align=right data-sort-value="0.78" | 780 m || 
|-id=253 bgcolor=#d6d6d6
| 335253 ||  || — || June 17, 2005 || Kitt Peak || Spacewatch || — || align=right | 3.6 km || 
|-id=254 bgcolor=#fefefe
| 335254 ||  || — || June 29, 2005 || Palomar || NEAT || NYS || align=right data-sort-value="0.89" | 890 m || 
|-id=255 bgcolor=#fefefe
| 335255 ||  || — || June 29, 2005 || Kitt Peak || Spacewatch || — || align=right data-sort-value="0.96" | 960 m || 
|-id=256 bgcolor=#fefefe
| 335256 ||  || — || June 29, 2005 || Palomar || NEAT || FLO || align=right data-sort-value="0.71" | 710 m || 
|-id=257 bgcolor=#fefefe
| 335257 ||  || — || June 30, 2005 || Kitt Peak || Spacewatch || — || align=right | 1.1 km || 
|-id=258 bgcolor=#fefefe
| 335258 ||  || — || June 30, 2005 || Kitt Peak || Spacewatch || NYS || align=right data-sort-value="0.62" | 620 m || 
|-id=259 bgcolor=#fefefe
| 335259 ||  || — || June 29, 2005 || Kitt Peak || Spacewatch || — || align=right data-sort-value="0.86" | 860 m || 
|-id=260 bgcolor=#fefefe
| 335260 ||  || — || June 29, 2005 || Palomar || NEAT || V || align=right data-sort-value="0.71" | 710 m || 
|-id=261 bgcolor=#fefefe
| 335261 ||  || — || June 30, 2005 || Kitt Peak || Spacewatch || — || align=right data-sort-value="0.83" | 830 m || 
|-id=262 bgcolor=#fefefe
| 335262 ||  || — || June 17, 2005 || Mount Lemmon || Mount Lemmon Survey || — || align=right data-sort-value="0.62" | 620 m || 
|-id=263 bgcolor=#fefefe
| 335263 ||  || — || June 18, 2005 || Mount Lemmon || Mount Lemmon Survey || — || align=right data-sort-value="0.70" | 700 m || 
|-id=264 bgcolor=#fefefe
| 335264 ||  || — || June 17, 2005 || Mount Lemmon || Mount Lemmon Survey || — || align=right data-sort-value="0.82" | 820 m || 
|-id=265 bgcolor=#fefefe
| 335265 ||  || — || July 3, 2005 || Mount Lemmon || Mount Lemmon Survey || — || align=right data-sort-value="0.82" | 820 m || 
|-id=266 bgcolor=#fefefe
| 335266 ||  || — || July 4, 2005 || Mount Lemmon || Mount Lemmon Survey || PHO || align=right | 1.1 km || 
|-id=267 bgcolor=#fefefe
| 335267 ||  || — || June 13, 2005 || Mount Lemmon || Mount Lemmon Survey || — || align=right data-sort-value="0.65" | 650 m || 
|-id=268 bgcolor=#fefefe
| 335268 ||  || — || July 2, 2005 || Kitt Peak || Spacewatch || — || align=right data-sort-value="0.68" | 680 m || 
|-id=269 bgcolor=#fefefe
| 335269 ||  || — || July 4, 2005 || Palomar || NEAT || — || align=right | 1.1 km || 
|-id=270 bgcolor=#fefefe
| 335270 ||  || — || July 2, 2005 || Kitt Peak || Spacewatch || — || align=right data-sort-value="0.89" | 890 m || 
|-id=271 bgcolor=#FA8072
| 335271 ||  || — || July 3, 2005 || Palomar || NEAT || — || align=right | 1.0 km || 
|-id=272 bgcolor=#fefefe
| 335272 ||  || — || July 5, 2005 || Mount Lemmon || Mount Lemmon Survey || — || align=right data-sort-value="0.85" | 850 m || 
|-id=273 bgcolor=#fefefe
| 335273 ||  || — || July 1, 2005 || Kitt Peak || Spacewatch || V || align=right data-sort-value="0.63" | 630 m || 
|-id=274 bgcolor=#fefefe
| 335274 ||  || — || July 1, 2005 || Kitt Peak || Spacewatch || — || align=right | 1.2 km || 
|-id=275 bgcolor=#fefefe
| 335275 ||  || — || July 5, 2005 || Palomar || NEAT || — || align=right data-sort-value="0.78" | 780 m || 
|-id=276 bgcolor=#fefefe
| 335276 ||  || — || July 5, 2005 || Palomar || NEAT || FLO || align=right data-sort-value="0.80" | 800 m || 
|-id=277 bgcolor=#fefefe
| 335277 ||  || — || July 6, 2005 || Kitt Peak || Spacewatch || — || align=right data-sort-value="0.80" | 800 m || 
|-id=278 bgcolor=#fefefe
| 335278 ||  || — || July 1, 2005 || Kitt Peak || Spacewatch || FLO || align=right data-sort-value="0.66" | 660 m || 
|-id=279 bgcolor=#fefefe
| 335279 ||  || — || July 15, 2005 || Kitt Peak || Spacewatch || — || align=right | 1.1 km || 
|-id=280 bgcolor=#fefefe
| 335280 ||  || — || July 12, 2005 || Mount Lemmon || Mount Lemmon Survey || V || align=right data-sort-value="0.77" | 770 m || 
|-id=281 bgcolor=#fefefe
| 335281 ||  || — || July 8, 2005 || Kitt Peak || Spacewatch || FLO || align=right data-sort-value="0.67" | 670 m || 
|-id=282 bgcolor=#fefefe
| 335282 ||  || — || July 28, 2005 || Palomar || NEAT || — || align=right data-sort-value="0.95" | 950 m || 
|-id=283 bgcolor=#FA8072
| 335283 ||  || — || June 20, 2005 || Palomar || NEAT || — || align=right data-sort-value="0.95" | 950 m || 
|-id=284 bgcolor=#fefefe
| 335284 ||  || — || July 27, 2005 || Palomar || NEAT || V || align=right data-sort-value="0.76" | 760 m || 
|-id=285 bgcolor=#fefefe
| 335285 ||  || — || July 29, 2005 || Palomar || NEAT || FLO || align=right data-sort-value="0.73" | 730 m || 
|-id=286 bgcolor=#fefefe
| 335286 ||  || — || July 29, 2005 || Palomar || NEAT || — || align=right data-sort-value="0.90" | 900 m || 
|-id=287 bgcolor=#fefefe
| 335287 ||  || — || July 28, 2005 || Palomar || NEAT || V || align=right data-sort-value="0.86" | 860 m || 
|-id=288 bgcolor=#fefefe
| 335288 ||  || — || July 31, 2005 || Siding Spring || SSS || — || align=right data-sort-value="0.77" | 770 m || 
|-id=289 bgcolor=#fefefe
| 335289 ||  || — || July 29, 2005 || Anderson Mesa || LONEOS || — || align=right data-sort-value="0.85" | 850 m || 
|-id=290 bgcolor=#fefefe
| 335290 ||  || — || July 29, 2005 || Anderson Mesa || LONEOS || — || align=right | 1.0 km || 
|-id=291 bgcolor=#fefefe
| 335291 ||  || — || August 1, 2005 || Siding Spring || SSS || — || align=right | 1.3 km || 
|-id=292 bgcolor=#fefefe
| 335292 Larrey ||  ||  || August 3, 2005 || Saint-Sulpice || Saint-Sulpice Obs. || — || align=right data-sort-value="0.78" | 780 m || 
|-id=293 bgcolor=#fefefe
| 335293 ||  || — || August 4, 2005 || Palomar || NEAT || FLO || align=right data-sort-value="0.73" | 730 m || 
|-id=294 bgcolor=#fefefe
| 335294 ||  || — || August 4, 2005 || Palomar || NEAT || ERI || align=right | 1.4 km || 
|-id=295 bgcolor=#fefefe
| 335295 ||  || — || August 6, 2005 || Palomar || NEAT || NYS || align=right data-sort-value="0.90" | 900 m || 
|-id=296 bgcolor=#fefefe
| 335296 ||  || — || August 24, 2005 || Palomar || NEAT || — || align=right data-sort-value="0.88" | 880 m || 
|-id=297 bgcolor=#fefefe
| 335297 ||  || — || August 25, 2005 || Palomar || NEAT || — || align=right | 1.0 km || 
|-id=298 bgcolor=#fefefe
| 335298 ||  || — || August 25, 2005 || Campo Imperatore || CINEOS || — || align=right data-sort-value="0.90" | 900 m || 
|-id=299 bgcolor=#fefefe
| 335299 ||  || — || August 24, 2005 || Palomar || NEAT || FLO || align=right data-sort-value="0.77" | 770 m || 
|-id=300 bgcolor=#fefefe
| 335300 ||  || — || August 24, 2005 || Palomar || NEAT || KLI || align=right | 2.1 km || 
|}

335301–335400 

|-bgcolor=#fefefe
| 335301 ||  || — || August 22, 2005 || Palomar || NEAT || PHO || align=right | 3.1 km || 
|-id=302 bgcolor=#fefefe
| 335302 ||  || — || August 24, 2005 || Palomar || NEAT || — || align=right | 1.1 km || 
|-id=303 bgcolor=#fefefe
| 335303 ||  || — || August 25, 2005 || Palomar || NEAT || — || align=right data-sort-value="0.94" | 940 m || 
|-id=304 bgcolor=#fefefe
| 335304 ||  || — || August 27, 2005 || Kitt Peak || Spacewatch || — || align=right data-sort-value="0.94" | 940 m || 
|-id=305 bgcolor=#fefefe
| 335305 ||  || — || August 27, 2005 || Anderson Mesa || LONEOS || — || align=right data-sort-value="0.97" | 970 m || 
|-id=306 bgcolor=#fefefe
| 335306 Mouhot ||  ||  || August 28, 2005 || Saint-Sulpice || B. Christophe || — || align=right data-sort-value="0.78" | 780 m || 
|-id=307 bgcolor=#fefefe
| 335307 ||  || — || August 25, 2005 || Palomar || NEAT || — || align=right data-sort-value="0.94" | 940 m || 
|-id=308 bgcolor=#fefefe
| 335308 ||  || — || August 25, 2005 || Palomar || NEAT || — || align=right data-sort-value="0.75" | 750 m || 
|-id=309 bgcolor=#fefefe
| 335309 ||  || — || August 25, 2005 || Palomar || NEAT || fast? || align=right | 1.1 km || 
|-id=310 bgcolor=#fefefe
| 335310 ||  || — || August 25, 2005 || Palomar || NEAT || — || align=right data-sort-value="0.95" | 950 m || 
|-id=311 bgcolor=#fefefe
| 335311 ||  || — || August 26, 2005 || Palomar || NEAT || — || align=right data-sort-value="0.98" | 980 m || 
|-id=312 bgcolor=#fefefe
| 335312 ||  || — || August 26, 2005 || Palomar || NEAT || — || align=right data-sort-value="0.74" | 740 m || 
|-id=313 bgcolor=#fefefe
| 335313 ||  || — || August 26, 2005 || Palomar || NEAT || NYS || align=right data-sort-value="0.81" | 810 m || 
|-id=314 bgcolor=#fefefe
| 335314 ||  || — || August 28, 2005 || Kitt Peak || Spacewatch || FLO || align=right data-sort-value="0.74" | 740 m || 
|-id=315 bgcolor=#fefefe
| 335315 ||  || — || August 28, 2005 || Kitt Peak || Spacewatch || — || align=right data-sort-value="0.89" | 890 m || 
|-id=316 bgcolor=#fefefe
| 335316 ||  || — || August 29, 2005 || Socorro || LINEAR || — || align=right | 1.0 km || 
|-id=317 bgcolor=#fefefe
| 335317 ||  || — || August 29, 2005 || Anderson Mesa || LONEOS || V || align=right | 1.1 km || 
|-id=318 bgcolor=#fefefe
| 335318 ||  || — || August 28, 2005 || Anderson Mesa || LONEOS || — || align=right | 1.0 km || 
|-id=319 bgcolor=#fefefe
| 335319 ||  || — || August 29, 2005 || Anderson Mesa || LONEOS || — || align=right data-sort-value="0.89" | 890 m || 
|-id=320 bgcolor=#fefefe
| 335320 ||  || — || August 29, 2005 || Anderson Mesa || LONEOS || — || align=right | 1.1 km || 
|-id=321 bgcolor=#fefefe
| 335321 ||  || — || August 26, 2005 || Anderson Mesa || LONEOS || — || align=right data-sort-value="0.82" | 820 m || 
|-id=322 bgcolor=#fefefe
| 335322 ||  || — || August 27, 2005 || Palomar || NEAT || — || align=right data-sort-value="0.86" | 860 m || 
|-id=323 bgcolor=#FA8072
| 335323 ||  || — || August 27, 2005 || Palomar || NEAT || — || align=right | 1.0 km || 
|-id=324 bgcolor=#fefefe
| 335324 ||  || — || August 27, 2005 || Palomar || NEAT || NYS || align=right data-sort-value="0.69" | 690 m || 
|-id=325 bgcolor=#fefefe
| 335325 ||  || — || August 28, 2005 || Kitt Peak || Spacewatch || — || align=right data-sort-value="0.80" | 800 m || 
|-id=326 bgcolor=#fefefe
| 335326 ||  || — || August 28, 2005 || Kitt Peak || Spacewatch || — || align=right data-sort-value="0.86" | 860 m || 
|-id=327 bgcolor=#fefefe
| 335327 ||  || — || August 28, 2005 || Kitt Peak || Spacewatch || — || align=right | 1.1 km || 
|-id=328 bgcolor=#fefefe
| 335328 ||  || — || August 25, 2005 || Palomar || NEAT || — || align=right data-sort-value="0.76" | 760 m || 
|-id=329 bgcolor=#fefefe
| 335329 ||  || — || August 28, 2005 || Siding Spring || SSS || — || align=right | 1.0 km || 
|-id=330 bgcolor=#fefefe
| 335330 ||  || — || August 31, 2005 || Kitt Peak || Spacewatch || NYS || align=right data-sort-value="0.63" | 630 m || 
|-id=331 bgcolor=#fefefe
| 335331 ||  || — || August 25, 2005 || Palomar || NEAT || MAS || align=right data-sort-value="0.78" | 780 m || 
|-id=332 bgcolor=#fefefe
| 335332 ||  || — || September 1, 2005 || Wrightwood || J. W. Young || V || align=right data-sort-value="0.87" | 870 m || 
|-id=333 bgcolor=#fefefe
| 335333 ||  || — || September 11, 2005 || Junk Bond || D. Healy || FLO || align=right data-sort-value="0.63" | 630 m || 
|-id=334 bgcolor=#fefefe
| 335334 ||  || — || September 6, 2005 || Anderson Mesa || LONEOS || NYS || align=right data-sort-value="0.74" | 740 m || 
|-id=335 bgcolor=#fefefe
| 335335 ||  || — || September 6, 2005 || Anderson Mesa || LONEOS || — || align=right data-sort-value="0.89" | 890 m || 
|-id=336 bgcolor=#fefefe
| 335336 ||  || — || September 6, 2005 || Socorro || LINEAR || — || align=right data-sort-value="0.91" | 910 m || 
|-id=337 bgcolor=#fefefe
| 335337 || 2005 SM || — || September 22, 2005 || Uccle || T. Pauwels || V || align=right data-sort-value="0.71" | 710 m || 
|-id=338 bgcolor=#fefefe
| 335338 ||  || — || September 25, 2005 || Kitt Peak || Spacewatch || MAS || align=right data-sort-value="0.78" | 780 m || 
|-id=339 bgcolor=#fefefe
| 335339 ||  || — || September 26, 2005 || Socorro || LINEAR || PHO || align=right | 1.5 km || 
|-id=340 bgcolor=#fefefe
| 335340 ||  || — || September 24, 2005 || Great Shefford || P. Birtwhistle || V || align=right data-sort-value="0.87" | 870 m || 
|-id=341 bgcolor=#fefefe
| 335341 ||  || — || September 25, 2005 || Kingsnake || J. V. McClusky || — || align=right data-sort-value="0.99" | 990 m || 
|-id=342 bgcolor=#fefefe
| 335342 ||  || — || September 23, 2005 || Kitt Peak || Spacewatch || NYS || align=right data-sort-value="0.61" | 610 m || 
|-id=343 bgcolor=#fefefe
| 335343 ||  || — || September 23, 2005 || Kitt Peak || Spacewatch || — || align=right data-sort-value="0.75" | 750 m || 
|-id=344 bgcolor=#fefefe
| 335344 ||  || — || September 24, 2005 || Kitt Peak || Spacewatch || V || align=right data-sort-value="0.96" | 960 m || 
|-id=345 bgcolor=#fefefe
| 335345 ||  || — || September 24, 2005 || Kitt Peak || Spacewatch || NYS || align=right data-sort-value="0.78" | 780 m || 
|-id=346 bgcolor=#fefefe
| 335346 ||  || — || September 24, 2005 || Kitt Peak || Spacewatch || — || align=right | 1.0 km || 
|-id=347 bgcolor=#fefefe
| 335347 ||  || — || September 24, 2005 || Kitt Peak || Spacewatch || NYS || align=right data-sort-value="0.71" | 710 m || 
|-id=348 bgcolor=#fefefe
| 335348 ||  || — || September 24, 2005 || Kitt Peak || Spacewatch || MAS || align=right data-sort-value="0.77" | 770 m || 
|-id=349 bgcolor=#fefefe
| 335349 ||  || — || September 25, 2005 || Catalina || CSS || — || align=right data-sort-value="0.80" | 800 m || 
|-id=350 bgcolor=#fefefe
| 335350 ||  || — || September 25, 2005 || Kitt Peak || Spacewatch || MASfast? || align=right data-sort-value="0.79" | 790 m || 
|-id=351 bgcolor=#fefefe
| 335351 ||  || — || September 26, 2005 || Palomar || NEAT || — || align=right | 1.0 km || 
|-id=352 bgcolor=#fefefe
| 335352 ||  || — || September 26, 2005 || Palomar || NEAT || — || align=right | 1.1 km || 
|-id=353 bgcolor=#fefefe
| 335353 ||  || — || September 27, 2005 || Kitt Peak || Spacewatch || — || align=right data-sort-value="0.90" | 900 m || 
|-id=354 bgcolor=#fefefe
| 335354 ||  || — || September 27, 2005 || Kitt Peak || Spacewatch || ERI || align=right | 1.9 km || 
|-id=355 bgcolor=#fefefe
| 335355 ||  || — || September 23, 2005 || Kitt Peak || Spacewatch || MAS || align=right | 1.0 km || 
|-id=356 bgcolor=#fefefe
| 335356 ||  || — || September 24, 2005 || Kitt Peak || Spacewatch || NYS || align=right data-sort-value="0.93" | 930 m || 
|-id=357 bgcolor=#fefefe
| 335357 ||  || — || September 25, 2005 || Kitt Peak || Spacewatch || — || align=right | 1.0 km || 
|-id=358 bgcolor=#fefefe
| 335358 ||  || — || September 25, 2005 || Palomar || NEAT || NYS || align=right data-sort-value="0.75" | 750 m || 
|-id=359 bgcolor=#fefefe
| 335359 ||  || — || September 25, 2005 || Kitt Peak || Spacewatch || NYS || align=right data-sort-value="0.96" | 960 m || 
|-id=360 bgcolor=#fefefe
| 335360 ||  || — || September 26, 2005 || Kitt Peak || Spacewatch || MAS || align=right data-sort-value="0.88" | 880 m || 
|-id=361 bgcolor=#fefefe
| 335361 ||  || — || September 26, 2005 || Palomar || NEAT || V || align=right data-sort-value="0.92" | 920 m || 
|-id=362 bgcolor=#fefefe
| 335362 ||  || — || September 26, 2005 || Palomar || NEAT || V || align=right data-sort-value="0.92" | 920 m || 
|-id=363 bgcolor=#fefefe
| 335363 ||  || — || September 28, 2005 || Palomar || NEAT || NYS || align=right data-sort-value="0.90" | 900 m || 
|-id=364 bgcolor=#fefefe
| 335364 ||  || — || September 29, 2005 || Kitt Peak || Spacewatch || — || align=right data-sort-value="0.91" | 910 m || 
|-id=365 bgcolor=#fefefe
| 335365 ||  || — || September 29, 2005 || Kitt Peak || Spacewatch || — || align=right | 1.1 km || 
|-id=366 bgcolor=#d6d6d6
| 335366 ||  || — || September 25, 2005 || Kitt Peak || Spacewatch || SHU3:2 || align=right | 5.4 km || 
|-id=367 bgcolor=#fefefe
| 335367 ||  || — || September 25, 2005 || Kitt Peak || Spacewatch || NYS || align=right data-sort-value="0.81" | 810 m || 
|-id=368 bgcolor=#fefefe
| 335368 ||  || — || September 25, 2005 || Kitt Peak || Spacewatch || KLI || align=right | 2.5 km || 
|-id=369 bgcolor=#fefefe
| 335369 ||  || — || September 25, 2005 || Kitt Peak || Spacewatch || — || align=right data-sort-value="0.83" | 830 m || 
|-id=370 bgcolor=#fefefe
| 335370 ||  || — || September 26, 2005 || Kitt Peak || Spacewatch || — || align=right data-sort-value="0.71" | 710 m || 
|-id=371 bgcolor=#fefefe
| 335371 ||  || — || September 27, 2005 || Palomar || NEAT || — || align=right | 1.2 km || 
|-id=372 bgcolor=#fefefe
| 335372 ||  || — || September 28, 2005 || Palomar || NEAT || — || align=right data-sort-value="0.95" | 950 m || 
|-id=373 bgcolor=#fefefe
| 335373 ||  || — || September 29, 2005 || Kitt Peak || Spacewatch || V || align=right data-sort-value="0.77" | 770 m || 
|-id=374 bgcolor=#fefefe
| 335374 ||  || — || September 29, 2005 || Kitt Peak || Spacewatch || NYS || align=right data-sort-value="0.60" | 600 m || 
|-id=375 bgcolor=#fefefe
| 335375 ||  || — || September 29, 2005 || Kitt Peak || Spacewatch || MAS || align=right data-sort-value="0.79" | 790 m || 
|-id=376 bgcolor=#fefefe
| 335376 ||  || — || September 29, 2005 || Catalina || CSS || — || align=right | 1.0 km || 
|-id=377 bgcolor=#fefefe
| 335377 ||  || — || September 30, 2005 || Kitt Peak || Spacewatch || FLO || align=right data-sort-value="0.77" | 770 m || 
|-id=378 bgcolor=#fefefe
| 335378 ||  || — || September 30, 2005 || Palomar || NEAT || — || align=right | 1.1 km || 
|-id=379 bgcolor=#fefefe
| 335379 ||  || — || September 30, 2005 || Anderson Mesa || LONEOS || — || align=right | 1.2 km || 
|-id=380 bgcolor=#fefefe
| 335380 ||  || — || September 30, 2005 || Catalina || CSS || — || align=right | 1.0 km || 
|-id=381 bgcolor=#fefefe
| 335381 ||  || — || September 30, 2005 || Mount Lemmon || Mount Lemmon Survey || MAS || align=right data-sort-value="0.71" | 710 m || 
|-id=382 bgcolor=#fefefe
| 335382 ||  || — || September 30, 2005 || Mount Lemmon || Mount Lemmon Survey || MAS || align=right data-sort-value="0.81" | 810 m || 
|-id=383 bgcolor=#fefefe
| 335383 ||  || — || September 29, 2005 || Anderson Mesa || LONEOS || — || align=right | 1.1 km || 
|-id=384 bgcolor=#fefefe
| 335384 ||  || — || September 23, 2005 || Palomar || NEAT || V || align=right data-sort-value="0.82" | 820 m || 
|-id=385 bgcolor=#fefefe
| 335385 ||  || — || September 22, 2005 || Palomar || NEAT || — || align=right | 1.00 km || 
|-id=386 bgcolor=#fefefe
| 335386 ||  || — || September 23, 2005 || Catalina || CSS || — || align=right data-sort-value="0.90" | 900 m || 
|-id=387 bgcolor=#fefefe
| 335387 ||  || — || September 26, 2005 || Kitt Peak || Spacewatch || V || align=right data-sort-value="0.62" | 620 m || 
|-id=388 bgcolor=#E9E9E9
| 335388 ||  || — || September 30, 2005 || Mauna Kea || Mauna Kea Obs. || — || align=right | 2.2 km || 
|-id=389 bgcolor=#fefefe
| 335389 ||  || — || October 1, 2005 || Catalina || CSS || NYS || align=right | 1.7 km || 
|-id=390 bgcolor=#fefefe
| 335390 ||  || — || October 1, 2005 || Catalina || CSS || — || align=right | 1.0 km || 
|-id=391 bgcolor=#fefefe
| 335391 ||  || — || October 1, 2005 || Anderson Mesa || LONEOS || ERI || align=right | 1.5 km || 
|-id=392 bgcolor=#fefefe
| 335392 ||  || — || October 1, 2005 || Catalina || CSS || V || align=right data-sort-value="0.70" | 700 m || 
|-id=393 bgcolor=#fefefe
| 335393 ||  || — || October 1, 2005 || Mount Lemmon || Mount Lemmon Survey || — || align=right | 1.0 km || 
|-id=394 bgcolor=#fefefe
| 335394 ||  || — || October 1, 2005 || Mount Lemmon || Mount Lemmon Survey || — || align=right data-sort-value="0.88" | 880 m || 
|-id=395 bgcolor=#fefefe
| 335395 ||  || — || October 3, 2005 || Catalina || CSS || V || align=right data-sort-value="0.91" | 910 m || 
|-id=396 bgcolor=#fefefe
| 335396 ||  || — || October 1, 2005 || Socorro || LINEAR || NYS || align=right data-sort-value="0.81" | 810 m || 
|-id=397 bgcolor=#fefefe
| 335397 ||  || — || October 1, 2005 || Socorro || LINEAR || NYS || align=right data-sort-value="0.80" | 800 m || 
|-id=398 bgcolor=#fefefe
| 335398 ||  || — || October 1, 2005 || Socorro || LINEAR || NYS || align=right data-sort-value="0.74" | 740 m || 
|-id=399 bgcolor=#fefefe
| 335399 ||  || — || October 1, 2005 || Kitt Peak || Spacewatch || MAS || align=right data-sort-value="0.83" | 830 m || 
|-id=400 bgcolor=#fefefe
| 335400 ||  || — || October 1, 2005 || Anderson Mesa || LONEOS || — || align=right | 1.0 km || 
|}

335401–335500 

|-bgcolor=#fefefe
| 335401 ||  || — || October 1, 2005 || Catalina || CSS || — || align=right data-sort-value="0.94" | 940 m || 
|-id=402 bgcolor=#fefefe
| 335402 ||  || — || October 1, 2005 || Catalina || CSS || NYS || align=right data-sort-value="0.91" | 910 m || 
|-id=403 bgcolor=#fefefe
| 335403 ||  || — || October 5, 2005 || Kitt Peak || Spacewatch || NYS || align=right data-sort-value="0.99" | 990 m || 
|-id=404 bgcolor=#fefefe
| 335404 ||  || — || October 3, 2005 || Catalina || CSS || — || align=right | 1.2 km || 
|-id=405 bgcolor=#fefefe
| 335405 ||  || — || October 7, 2005 || Catalina || CSS || — || align=right | 1.1 km || 
|-id=406 bgcolor=#fefefe
| 335406 ||  || — || October 7, 2005 || Catalina || CSS || V || align=right data-sort-value="0.85" | 850 m || 
|-id=407 bgcolor=#fefefe
| 335407 ||  || — || September 29, 2005 || Kitt Peak || Spacewatch || — || align=right data-sort-value="0.82" | 820 m || 
|-id=408 bgcolor=#fefefe
| 335408 ||  || — || October 7, 2005 || Kitt Peak || Spacewatch || — || align=right data-sort-value="0.80" | 800 m || 
|-id=409 bgcolor=#fefefe
| 335409 ||  || — || October 7, 2005 || Kitt Peak || Spacewatch || NYS || align=right data-sort-value="0.63" | 630 m || 
|-id=410 bgcolor=#fefefe
| 335410 ||  || — || October 7, 2005 || Kitt Peak || Spacewatch || — || align=right data-sort-value="0.76" | 760 m || 
|-id=411 bgcolor=#fefefe
| 335411 ||  || — || October 7, 2005 || Kitt Peak || Spacewatch || — || align=right | 1.0 km || 
|-id=412 bgcolor=#fefefe
| 335412 ||  || — || October 7, 2005 || Kitt Peak || Spacewatch || — || align=right data-sort-value="0.89" | 890 m || 
|-id=413 bgcolor=#fefefe
| 335413 ||  || — || October 9, 2005 || Kitt Peak || Spacewatch || — || align=right data-sort-value="0.83" | 830 m || 
|-id=414 bgcolor=#E9E9E9
| 335414 ||  || — || October 6, 2005 || Mount Lemmon || Mount Lemmon Survey || — || align=right | 1.4 km || 
|-id=415 bgcolor=#fefefe
| 335415 ||  || — || October 22, 2005 || Junk Bond || D. Healy || — || align=right data-sort-value="0.91" | 910 m || 
|-id=416 bgcolor=#fefefe
| 335416 ||  || — || October 29, 2005 || Andrushivka || Andrushivka Obs. || NYS || align=right data-sort-value="0.85" | 850 m || 
|-id=417 bgcolor=#fefefe
| 335417 ||  || — || October 22, 2005 || Kitt Peak || Spacewatch || MAS || align=right | 1.0 km || 
|-id=418 bgcolor=#fefefe
| 335418 ||  || — || October 22, 2005 || Kitt Peak || Spacewatch || — || align=right data-sort-value="0.91" | 910 m || 
|-id=419 bgcolor=#fefefe
| 335419 ||  || — || October 23, 2005 || Catalina || CSS || — || align=right | 1.1 km || 
|-id=420 bgcolor=#fefefe
| 335420 ||  || — || October 24, 2005 || Kitt Peak || Spacewatch || MAS || align=right | 1.00 km || 
|-id=421 bgcolor=#fefefe
| 335421 ||  || — || October 22, 2005 || Kitt Peak || Spacewatch || — || align=right data-sort-value="0.85" | 850 m || 
|-id=422 bgcolor=#fefefe
| 335422 ||  || — || October 23, 2005 || Kitt Peak || Spacewatch || NYS || align=right data-sort-value="0.78" | 780 m || 
|-id=423 bgcolor=#fefefe
| 335423 ||  || — || October 23, 2005 || Palomar || NEAT || ERI || align=right | 1.7 km || 
|-id=424 bgcolor=#fefefe
| 335424 ||  || — || October 23, 2005 || Catalina || CSS || — || align=right | 1.2 km || 
|-id=425 bgcolor=#fefefe
| 335425 ||  || — || October 23, 2005 || Catalina || CSS || NYS || align=right data-sort-value="0.70" | 700 m || 
|-id=426 bgcolor=#fefefe
| 335426 ||  || — || October 25, 2005 || Mount Lemmon || Mount Lemmon Survey || NYS || align=right data-sort-value="0.70" | 700 m || 
|-id=427 bgcolor=#fefefe
| 335427 ||  || — || October 23, 2005 || Catalina || CSS || — || align=right | 1.1 km || 
|-id=428 bgcolor=#fefefe
| 335428 ||  || — || October 22, 2005 || Kitt Peak || Spacewatch || NYS || align=right data-sort-value="0.78" | 780 m || 
|-id=429 bgcolor=#fefefe
| 335429 ||  || — || October 22, 2005 || Kitt Peak || Spacewatch || — || align=right data-sort-value="0.96" | 960 m || 
|-id=430 bgcolor=#fefefe
| 335430 ||  || — || October 22, 2005 || Kitt Peak || Spacewatch || — || align=right | 1.0 km || 
|-id=431 bgcolor=#fefefe
| 335431 ||  || — || October 22, 2005 || Kitt Peak || Spacewatch || NYS || align=right data-sort-value="0.76" | 760 m || 
|-id=432 bgcolor=#fefefe
| 335432 ||  || — || October 27, 2005 || Socorro || LINEAR || — || align=right data-sort-value="0.96" | 960 m || 
|-id=433 bgcolor=#fefefe
| 335433 ||  || — || October 24, 2005 || Kitt Peak || Spacewatch || NYSfast || align=right data-sort-value="0.74" | 740 m || 
|-id=434 bgcolor=#fefefe
| 335434 ||  || — || October 24, 2005 || Kitt Peak || Spacewatch || — || align=right | 1.1 km || 
|-id=435 bgcolor=#fefefe
| 335435 ||  || — || October 27, 2005 || Kitt Peak || Spacewatch || MAS || align=right data-sort-value="0.72" | 720 m || 
|-id=436 bgcolor=#fefefe
| 335436 ||  || — || October 25, 2005 || Kitt Peak || Spacewatch || NYS || align=right data-sort-value="0.84" | 840 m || 
|-id=437 bgcolor=#E9E9E9
| 335437 ||  || — || October 25, 2005 || Kitt Peak || Spacewatch || — || align=right | 1.3 km || 
|-id=438 bgcolor=#fefefe
| 335438 ||  || — || October 26, 2005 || Kitt Peak || Spacewatch || NYS || align=right data-sort-value="0.82" | 820 m || 
|-id=439 bgcolor=#fefefe
| 335439 ||  || — || October 26, 2005 || Kitt Peak || Spacewatch || — || align=right | 1.4 km || 
|-id=440 bgcolor=#fefefe
| 335440 ||  || — || October 26, 2005 || Kitt Peak || Spacewatch || ERI || align=right | 2.0 km || 
|-id=441 bgcolor=#fefefe
| 335441 ||  || — || October 26, 2005 || Kitt Peak || Spacewatch || ERI || align=right | 1.6 km || 
|-id=442 bgcolor=#fefefe
| 335442 ||  || — || October 29, 2005 || Catalina || CSS || LCI || align=right | 1.2 km || 
|-id=443 bgcolor=#fefefe
| 335443 ||  || — || October 27, 2005 || Mount Lemmon || Mount Lemmon Survey || — || align=right data-sort-value="0.80" | 800 m || 
|-id=444 bgcolor=#fefefe
| 335444 ||  || — || October 29, 2005 || Catalina || CSS || — || align=right | 1.3 km || 
|-id=445 bgcolor=#fefefe
| 335445 ||  || — || October 29, 2005 || Catalina || CSS || — || align=right | 1.3 km || 
|-id=446 bgcolor=#fefefe
| 335446 ||  || — || October 30, 2005 || Mount Lemmon || Mount Lemmon Survey || — || align=right data-sort-value="0.82" | 820 m || 
|-id=447 bgcolor=#fefefe
| 335447 ||  || — || October 27, 2005 || Anderson Mesa || LONEOS || — || align=right | 1.1 km || 
|-id=448 bgcolor=#fefefe
| 335448 ||  || — || October 28, 2005 || Catalina || CSS || MAS || align=right data-sort-value="0.73" | 730 m || 
|-id=449 bgcolor=#fefefe
| 335449 ||  || — || October 5, 2005 || Kitt Peak || Spacewatch || ERI || align=right | 1.3 km || 
|-id=450 bgcolor=#fefefe
| 335450 ||  || — || October 28, 2005 || Kitt Peak || Spacewatch || SUL || align=right | 1.8 km || 
|-id=451 bgcolor=#FA8072
| 335451 ||  || — || October 28, 2005 || Catalina || CSS || — || align=right | 1.1 km || 
|-id=452 bgcolor=#d6d6d6
| 335452 ||  || — || October 29, 2005 || Catalina || CSS || HIL3:2 || align=right | 7.4 km || 
|-id=453 bgcolor=#d6d6d6
| 335453 ||  || — || October 27, 2005 || Mount Lemmon || Mount Lemmon Survey || 3:2 || align=right | 6.5 km || 
|-id=454 bgcolor=#fefefe
| 335454 ||  || — || October 25, 2005 || Mount Lemmon || Mount Lemmon Survey || — || align=right data-sort-value="0.82" | 820 m || 
|-id=455 bgcolor=#d6d6d6
| 335455 ||  || — || October 1, 2005 || Apache Point || A. C. Becker || HIL3:2 || align=right | 4.4 km || 
|-id=456 bgcolor=#fefefe
| 335456 ||  || — || October 26, 2005 || Apache Point || A. C. Becker || — || align=right data-sort-value="0.68" | 680 m || 
|-id=457 bgcolor=#fefefe
| 335457 ||  || — || November 1, 2005 || Socorro || LINEAR || — || align=right | 2.4 km || 
|-id=458 bgcolor=#fefefe
| 335458 ||  || — || November 5, 2005 || Catalina || CSS || ERI || align=right | 2.4 km || 
|-id=459 bgcolor=#fefefe
| 335459 ||  || — || November 3, 2005 || Mount Lemmon || Mount Lemmon Survey || — || align=right | 1.1 km || 
|-id=460 bgcolor=#fefefe
| 335460 ||  || — || November 3, 2005 || Mount Lemmon || Mount Lemmon Survey || — || align=right | 1.4 km || 
|-id=461 bgcolor=#fefefe
| 335461 ||  || — || November 5, 2005 || Catalina || CSS || — || align=right data-sort-value="0.90" | 900 m || 
|-id=462 bgcolor=#fefefe
| 335462 ||  || — || November 6, 2005 || Kitt Peak || Spacewatch || — || align=right data-sort-value="0.83" | 830 m || 
|-id=463 bgcolor=#fefefe
| 335463 ||  || — || October 29, 2005 || Kitt Peak || Spacewatch || — || align=right data-sort-value="0.86" | 860 m || 
|-id=464 bgcolor=#fefefe
| 335464 ||  || — || November 11, 2005 || Socorro || LINEAR || — || align=right | 1.5 km || 
|-id=465 bgcolor=#fefefe
| 335465 ||  || — || November 12, 2005 || Kitt Peak || Spacewatch || — || align=right | 1.1 km || 
|-id=466 bgcolor=#fefefe
| 335466 ||  || — || November 20, 2005 || Wrightwood || J. W. Young || MAS || align=right data-sort-value="0.90" | 900 m || 
|-id=467 bgcolor=#fefefe
| 335467 ||  || — || November 21, 2005 || Kitt Peak || Spacewatch || MAS || align=right data-sort-value="0.86" | 860 m || 
|-id=468 bgcolor=#fefefe
| 335468 ||  || — || November 22, 2005 || Kitt Peak || Spacewatch || V || align=right data-sort-value="0.75" | 750 m || 
|-id=469 bgcolor=#E9E9E9
| 335469 ||  || — || November 25, 2005 || Kitt Peak || Spacewatch || EUN || align=right | 1.7 km || 
|-id=470 bgcolor=#fefefe
| 335470 ||  || — || November 25, 2005 || Palomar || NEAT || — || align=right | 1.3 km || 
|-id=471 bgcolor=#E9E9E9
| 335471 ||  || — || November 25, 2005 || Mount Lemmon || Mount Lemmon Survey || — || align=right | 1.3 km || 
|-id=472 bgcolor=#fefefe
| 335472 ||  || — || November 25, 2005 || Kitt Peak || Spacewatch || — || align=right data-sort-value="0.94" | 940 m || 
|-id=473 bgcolor=#fefefe
| 335473 ||  || — || November 26, 2005 || Kitt Peak || Spacewatch || MAS || align=right data-sort-value="0.61" | 610 m || 
|-id=474 bgcolor=#fefefe
| 335474 ||  || — || November 26, 2005 || Kitt Peak || Spacewatch || NYS || align=right data-sort-value="0.86" | 860 m || 
|-id=475 bgcolor=#fefefe
| 335475 ||  || — || November 26, 2005 || Kitt Peak || Spacewatch || MAS || align=right data-sort-value="0.86" | 860 m || 
|-id=476 bgcolor=#E9E9E9
| 335476 ||  || — || November 28, 2005 || Mount Lemmon || Mount Lemmon Survey || — || align=right | 1.4 km || 
|-id=477 bgcolor=#fefefe
| 335477 ||  || — || November 26, 2005 || Catalina || CSS || — || align=right | 1.00 km || 
|-id=478 bgcolor=#E9E9E9
| 335478 ||  || — || November 30, 2005 || Mount Lemmon || Mount Lemmon Survey || — || align=right | 1.00 km || 
|-id=479 bgcolor=#fefefe
| 335479 ||  || — || November 28, 2005 || Mount Lemmon || Mount Lemmon Survey || MAS || align=right data-sort-value="0.77" | 770 m || 
|-id=480 bgcolor=#fefefe
| 335480 ||  || — || November 25, 2005 || Mount Lemmon || Mount Lemmon Survey || — || align=right data-sort-value="0.80" | 800 m || 
|-id=481 bgcolor=#fefefe
| 335481 ||  || — || November 26, 2005 || Mount Lemmon || Mount Lemmon Survey || CLA || align=right | 2.1 km || 
|-id=482 bgcolor=#E9E9E9
| 335482 ||  || — || November 26, 2005 || Mount Lemmon || Mount Lemmon Survey || — || align=right | 1.0 km || 
|-id=483 bgcolor=#fefefe
| 335483 ||  || — || November 30, 2005 || Palomar || NEAT || — || align=right | 1.0 km || 
|-id=484 bgcolor=#fefefe
| 335484 ||  || — || November 28, 2005 || Kitt Peak || Spacewatch || — || align=right data-sort-value="0.98" | 980 m || 
|-id=485 bgcolor=#fefefe
| 335485 ||  || — || November 29, 2005 || Kitt Peak || Spacewatch || — || align=right data-sort-value="0.90" | 900 m || 
|-id=486 bgcolor=#E9E9E9
| 335486 ||  || — || November 30, 2005 || Kitt Peak || Spacewatch || — || align=right | 2.4 km || 
|-id=487 bgcolor=#fefefe
| 335487 ||  || — || November 29, 2005 || Socorro || LINEAR || — || align=right | 1.2 km || 
|-id=488 bgcolor=#E9E9E9
| 335488 ||  || — || November 25, 2005 || Mount Lemmon || Mount Lemmon Survey || — || align=right | 2.2 km || 
|-id=489 bgcolor=#fefefe
| 335489 ||  || — || November 21, 2005 || Kitt Peak || Spacewatch || MAS || align=right data-sort-value="0.59" | 590 m || 
|-id=490 bgcolor=#C2FFFF
| 335490 ||  || — || December 6, 2005 || Kitt Peak || Spacewatch || L5 || align=right | 13 km || 
|-id=491 bgcolor=#fefefe
| 335491 ||  || — || December 2, 2005 || Socorro || LINEAR || H || align=right data-sort-value="0.86" | 860 m || 
|-id=492 bgcolor=#E9E9E9
| 335492 ||  || — || December 2, 2005 || Kitt Peak || Spacewatch || — || align=right | 1.4 km || 
|-id=493 bgcolor=#fefefe
| 335493 ||  || — || December 5, 2005 || Mount Lemmon || Mount Lemmon Survey || — || align=right | 1.0 km || 
|-id=494 bgcolor=#fefefe
| 335494 ||  || — || December 8, 2005 || Kitt Peak || Spacewatch || MAS || align=right data-sort-value="0.92" | 920 m || 
|-id=495 bgcolor=#E9E9E9
| 335495 ||  || — || December 2, 2005 || Kitt Peak || Spacewatch || — || align=right | 2.7 km || 
|-id=496 bgcolor=#E9E9E9
| 335496 ||  || — || December 6, 2005 || Mount Lemmon || Mount Lemmon Survey || — || align=right | 1.9 km || 
|-id=497 bgcolor=#fefefe
| 335497 ||  || — || December 21, 2005 || Kitt Peak || Spacewatch || NYS || align=right data-sort-value="0.98" | 980 m || 
|-id=498 bgcolor=#fefefe
| 335498 ||  || — || December 22, 2005 || Catalina || CSS || H || align=right | 1.0 km || 
|-id=499 bgcolor=#fefefe
| 335499 ||  || — || December 22, 2005 || Kitt Peak || Spacewatch || — || align=right data-sort-value="0.98" | 980 m || 
|-id=500 bgcolor=#fefefe
| 335500 ||  || — || October 25, 2005 || Mount Lemmon || Mount Lemmon Survey || MAS || align=right data-sort-value="0.95" | 950 m || 
|}

335501–335600 

|-bgcolor=#fefefe
| 335501 ||  || — || December 24, 2005 || Kitt Peak || Spacewatch || — || align=right | 1.3 km || 
|-id=502 bgcolor=#E9E9E9
| 335502 ||  || — || December 22, 2005 || Kitt Peak || Spacewatch || ADE || align=right | 2.5 km || 
|-id=503 bgcolor=#E9E9E9
| 335503 ||  || — || December 25, 2005 || Kitt Peak || Spacewatch || — || align=right | 2.2 km || 
|-id=504 bgcolor=#E9E9E9
| 335504 ||  || — || December 25, 2005 || Kitt Peak || Spacewatch || — || align=right | 1.2 km || 
|-id=505 bgcolor=#fefefe
| 335505 ||  || — || March 10, 2003 || Kitt Peak || Spacewatch || MAS || align=right | 1.0 km || 
|-id=506 bgcolor=#E9E9E9
| 335506 ||  || — || December 26, 2005 || Marly || Naef Obs. || — || align=right | 1.3 km || 
|-id=507 bgcolor=#E9E9E9
| 335507 ||  || — || December 25, 2005 || Kitt Peak || Spacewatch || — || align=right | 1.1 km || 
|-id=508 bgcolor=#E9E9E9
| 335508 ||  || — || December 28, 2005 || Mount Lemmon || Mount Lemmon Survey || HEN || align=right | 1.1 km || 
|-id=509 bgcolor=#C2FFFF
| 335509 ||  || — || December 28, 2005 || Mount Lemmon || Mount Lemmon Survey || L5 || align=right | 12 km || 
|-id=510 bgcolor=#fefefe
| 335510 ||  || — || December 28, 2005 || Mount Lemmon || Mount Lemmon Survey || H || align=right data-sort-value="0.87" | 870 m || 
|-id=511 bgcolor=#fefefe
| 335511 ||  || — || December 19, 2001 || Palomar || NEAT || NYS || align=right data-sort-value="0.65" | 650 m || 
|-id=512 bgcolor=#E9E9E9
| 335512 ||  || — || December 28, 2005 || Kitt Peak || Spacewatch || — || align=right data-sort-value="0.94" | 940 m || 
|-id=513 bgcolor=#fefefe
| 335513 ||  || — || November 26, 2005 || Mount Lemmon || Mount Lemmon Survey || H || align=right data-sort-value="0.91" | 910 m || 
|-id=514 bgcolor=#E9E9E9
| 335514 ||  || — || December 31, 2005 || Kitt Peak || Spacewatch || — || align=right | 1.4 km || 
|-id=515 bgcolor=#E9E9E9
| 335515 ||  || — || December 30, 2005 || Socorro || LINEAR || RAF || align=right | 1.3 km || 
|-id=516 bgcolor=#E9E9E9
| 335516 ||  || — || December 25, 2005 || Mount Lemmon || Mount Lemmon Survey || — || align=right | 1.8 km || 
|-id=517 bgcolor=#E9E9E9
| 335517 ||  || — || December 27, 2005 || Mount Lemmon || Mount Lemmon Survey || ADE || align=right | 3.2 km || 
|-id=518 bgcolor=#E9E9E9
| 335518 ||  || — || December 25, 2005 || Anderson Mesa || LONEOS || — || align=right | 3.3 km || 
|-id=519 bgcolor=#fefefe
| 335519 ||  || — || December 31, 2005 || Mount Lemmon || Mount Lemmon Survey || — || align=right data-sort-value="0.80" | 800 m || 
|-id=520 bgcolor=#E9E9E9
| 335520 ||  || — || December 30, 2005 || Kitt Peak || Spacewatch || — || align=right data-sort-value="0.99" | 990 m || 
|-id=521 bgcolor=#E9E9E9
| 335521 ||  || — || December 30, 2005 || Kitt Peak || Spacewatch || EUN || align=right | 1.9 km || 
|-id=522 bgcolor=#E9E9E9
| 335522 ||  || — || December 25, 2005 || Mount Lemmon || Mount Lemmon Survey || AER || align=right | 3.8 km || 
|-id=523 bgcolor=#E9E9E9
| 335523 ||  || — || January 5, 2006 || Mount Lemmon || Mount Lemmon Survey || — || align=right | 1.6 km || 
|-id=524 bgcolor=#E9E9E9
| 335524 ||  || — || January 4, 2006 || Kitt Peak || Spacewatch || — || align=right | 1.3 km || 
|-id=525 bgcolor=#E9E9E9
| 335525 ||  || — || January 4, 2006 || Catalina || CSS || HNS || align=right | 1.3 km || 
|-id=526 bgcolor=#E9E9E9
| 335526 ||  || — || January 5, 2006 || Kitt Peak || Spacewatch || KON || align=right | 3.9 km || 
|-id=527 bgcolor=#E9E9E9
| 335527 ||  || — || January 5, 2006 || Mount Lemmon || Mount Lemmon Survey || — || align=right | 1.2 km || 
|-id=528 bgcolor=#E9E9E9
| 335528 ||  || — || January 5, 2006 || Catalina || CSS || MAR || align=right | 1.6 km || 
|-id=529 bgcolor=#E9E9E9
| 335529 ||  || — || January 8, 2006 || Kitt Peak || Spacewatch || — || align=right | 1.4 km || 
|-id=530 bgcolor=#E9E9E9
| 335530 ||  || — || January 4, 2006 || Mount Lemmon || Mount Lemmon Survey || DOR || align=right | 2.8 km || 
|-id=531 bgcolor=#fefefe
| 335531 ||  || — || January 6, 2006 || Kitt Peak || Spacewatch || — || align=right | 1.1 km || 
|-id=532 bgcolor=#E9E9E9
| 335532 ||  || — || January 6, 2006 || Anderson Mesa || LONEOS || BAR || align=right | 1.8 km || 
|-id=533 bgcolor=#E9E9E9
| 335533 Tarasprystavski ||  ||  || January 4, 2006 || Catalina || CSS || — || align=right | 2.9 km || 
|-id=534 bgcolor=#E9E9E9
| 335534 ||  || — || January 12, 2006 || Palomar || NEAT || ADE || align=right | 3.4 km || 
|-id=535 bgcolor=#E9E9E9
| 335535 ||  || — || January 7, 2006 || Mount Lemmon || Mount Lemmon Survey || — || align=right | 2.5 km || 
|-id=536 bgcolor=#E9E9E9
| 335536 ||  || — || January 7, 2006 || Mount Lemmon || Mount Lemmon Survey || — || align=right | 1.4 km || 
|-id=537 bgcolor=#C2FFFF
| 335537 ||  || — || January 5, 2006 || Mount Lemmon || Mount Lemmon Survey || L5 || align=right | 12 km || 
|-id=538 bgcolor=#E9E9E9
| 335538 ||  || — || January 20, 2006 || Kitt Peak || Spacewatch || — || align=right | 2.1 km || 
|-id=539 bgcolor=#fefefe
| 335539 ||  || — || January 8, 2006 || Catalina || CSS || H || align=right | 1.1 km || 
|-id=540 bgcolor=#fefefe
| 335540 ||  || — || January 18, 2006 || Catalina || CSS || — || align=right | 1.3 km || 
|-id=541 bgcolor=#E9E9E9
| 335541 ||  || — || January 20, 2006 || Kitt Peak || Spacewatch || ADE || align=right | 2.3 km || 
|-id=542 bgcolor=#E9E9E9
| 335542 ||  || — || January 21, 2006 || Kitt Peak || Spacewatch || ADE || align=right | 3.0 km || 
|-id=543 bgcolor=#fefefe
| 335543 ||  || — || January 23, 2006 || Catalina || CSS || H || align=right data-sort-value="0.71" | 710 m || 
|-id=544 bgcolor=#fefefe
| 335544 ||  || — || January 22, 2006 || Catalina || CSS || H || align=right data-sort-value="0.76" | 760 m || 
|-id=545 bgcolor=#E9E9E9
| 335545 ||  || — || January 23, 2006 || Kitt Peak || Spacewatch || — || align=right | 1.6 km || 
|-id=546 bgcolor=#E9E9E9
| 335546 ||  || — || January 23, 2006 || Kitt Peak || Spacewatch || — || align=right | 2.2 km || 
|-id=547 bgcolor=#E9E9E9
| 335547 ||  || — || January 25, 2006 || Kitt Peak || Spacewatch || — || align=right | 1.3 km || 
|-id=548 bgcolor=#E9E9E9
| 335548 ||  || — || January 26, 2006 || Mount Lemmon || Mount Lemmon Survey || BAR || align=right | 2.2 km || 
|-id=549 bgcolor=#E9E9E9
| 335549 ||  || — || January 25, 2006 || Kitt Peak || Spacewatch || — || align=right data-sort-value="0.94" | 940 m || 
|-id=550 bgcolor=#E9E9E9
| 335550 ||  || — || August 22, 2003 || Palomar || NEAT || — || align=right | 1.9 km || 
|-id=551 bgcolor=#E9E9E9
| 335551 ||  || — || January 26, 2006 || Kitt Peak || Spacewatch || HNS || align=right | 1.5 km || 
|-id=552 bgcolor=#E9E9E9
| 335552 ||  || — || January 26, 2006 || Mount Lemmon || Mount Lemmon Survey || — || align=right | 2.8 km || 
|-id=553 bgcolor=#E9E9E9
| 335553 ||  || — || January 26, 2006 || Kitt Peak || Spacewatch || PAD || align=right | 2.9 km || 
|-id=554 bgcolor=#E9E9E9
| 335554 ||  || — || January 26, 2006 || Mount Lemmon || Mount Lemmon Survey || — || align=right | 3.2 km || 
|-id=555 bgcolor=#E9E9E9
| 335555 ||  || — || January 23, 2006 || Socorro || LINEAR || BRU || align=right | 5.0 km || 
|-id=556 bgcolor=#E9E9E9
| 335556 ||  || — || January 25, 2006 || Kitt Peak || Spacewatch || — || align=right | 2.6 km || 
|-id=557 bgcolor=#C2FFFF
| 335557 ||  || — || January 30, 2006 || Kitt Peak || Spacewatch || L5 || align=right | 7.8 km || 
|-id=558 bgcolor=#C2FFFF
| 335558 ||  || — || January 30, 2006 || Kitt Peak || Spacewatch || L5 || align=right | 8.9 km || 
|-id=559 bgcolor=#E9E9E9
| 335559 ||  || — || January 30, 2006 || Kitt Peak || Spacewatch || — || align=right | 1.5 km || 
|-id=560 bgcolor=#E9E9E9
| 335560 ||  || — || January 31, 2006 || Kitt Peak || Spacewatch || — || align=right | 1.6 km || 
|-id=561 bgcolor=#C2FFFF
| 335561 ||  || — || January 31, 2006 || Mount Lemmon || Mount Lemmon Survey || L5 || align=right | 13 km || 
|-id=562 bgcolor=#E9E9E9
| 335562 ||  || — || January 31, 2006 || Kitt Peak || Spacewatch || — || align=right | 1.0 km || 
|-id=563 bgcolor=#E9E9E9
| 335563 ||  || — || January 31, 2006 || Kitt Peak || Spacewatch || — || align=right | 3.1 km || 
|-id=564 bgcolor=#E9E9E9
| 335564 ||  || — || January 31, 2006 || Kitt Peak || Spacewatch || HNA || align=right | 2.3 km || 
|-id=565 bgcolor=#E9E9E9
| 335565 ||  || — || January 26, 2006 || Catalina || CSS || — || align=right | 2.4 km || 
|-id=566 bgcolor=#E9E9E9
| 335566 ||  || — || February 1, 2006 || Kitt Peak || Spacewatch || — || align=right | 2.5 km || 
|-id=567 bgcolor=#C2FFFF
| 335567 ||  || — || February 1, 2006 || Kitt Peak || Spacewatch || L5ENM || align=right | 17 km || 
|-id=568 bgcolor=#E9E9E9
| 335568 ||  || — || February 1, 2006 || Mount Lemmon || Mount Lemmon Survey || — || align=right | 2.0 km || 
|-id=569 bgcolor=#E9E9E9
| 335569 ||  || — || February 1, 2006 || Mount Lemmon || Mount Lemmon Survey || JUN || align=right | 1.7 km || 
|-id=570 bgcolor=#E9E9E9
| 335570 ||  || — || February 2, 2006 || Kitt Peak || Spacewatch || — || align=right | 1.4 km || 
|-id=571 bgcolor=#E9E9E9
| 335571 ||  || — || February 2, 2006 || Mount Lemmon || Mount Lemmon Survey || INO || align=right | 1.4 km || 
|-id=572 bgcolor=#E9E9E9
| 335572 ||  || — || February 3, 2006 || Kitt Peak || Spacewatch || — || align=right | 1.4 km || 
|-id=573 bgcolor=#E9E9E9
| 335573 ||  || — || January 20, 2006 || Kitt Peak || Spacewatch || — || align=right | 1.1 km || 
|-id=574 bgcolor=#C2FFFF
| 335574 ||  || — || February 4, 2006 || Kitt Peak || Spacewatch || L5 || align=right | 11 km || 
|-id=575 bgcolor=#E9E9E9
| 335575 ||  || — || February 20, 2006 || Kitt Peak || Spacewatch || — || align=right | 2.7 km || 
|-id=576 bgcolor=#E9E9E9
| 335576 ||  || — || February 20, 2006 || Catalina || CSS || — || align=right | 2.6 km || 
|-id=577 bgcolor=#E9E9E9
| 335577 ||  || — || February 20, 2006 || Catalina || CSS || — || align=right | 2.1 km || 
|-id=578 bgcolor=#E9E9E9
| 335578 ||  || — || February 22, 2006 || Catalina || CSS || — || align=right | 2.2 km || 
|-id=579 bgcolor=#E9E9E9
| 335579 ||  || — || January 23, 2006 || Kitt Peak || Spacewatch || — || align=right | 1.3 km || 
|-id=580 bgcolor=#E9E9E9
| 335580 ||  || — || February 20, 2006 || Kitt Peak || Spacewatch || — || align=right | 1.9 km || 
|-id=581 bgcolor=#E9E9E9
| 335581 ||  || — || February 20, 2006 || Kitt Peak || Spacewatch || — || align=right | 2.7 km || 
|-id=582 bgcolor=#E9E9E9
| 335582 ||  || — || February 20, 2006 || Mount Lemmon || Mount Lemmon Survey || — || align=right | 1.9 km || 
|-id=583 bgcolor=#E9E9E9
| 335583 ||  || — || February 4, 2006 || Mount Lemmon || Mount Lemmon Survey || AER || align=right | 1.5 km || 
|-id=584 bgcolor=#fefefe
| 335584 ||  || — || February 23, 2006 || Anderson Mesa || LONEOS || — || align=right | 1.0 km || 
|-id=585 bgcolor=#E9E9E9
| 335585 ||  || — || February 24, 2006 || Kitt Peak || Spacewatch || — || align=right | 1.8 km || 
|-id=586 bgcolor=#d6d6d6
| 335586 ||  || — || February 24, 2006 || Kitt Peak || Spacewatch || — || align=right | 2.8 km || 
|-id=587 bgcolor=#E9E9E9
| 335587 ||  || — || February 22, 2006 || Anderson Mesa || LONEOS || — || align=right | 3.5 km || 
|-id=588 bgcolor=#E9E9E9
| 335588 ||  || — || February 23, 2006 || Socorro || LINEAR || — || align=right | 4.2 km || 
|-id=589 bgcolor=#E9E9E9
| 335589 ||  || — || February 24, 2006 || Kitt Peak || Spacewatch || — || align=right | 2.7 km || 
|-id=590 bgcolor=#E9E9E9
| 335590 ||  || — || February 24, 2006 || Mount Lemmon || Mount Lemmon Survey || — || align=right | 4.4 km || 
|-id=591 bgcolor=#E9E9E9
| 335591 ||  || — || February 25, 2006 || Kitt Peak || Spacewatch || — || align=right | 1.0 km || 
|-id=592 bgcolor=#E9E9E9
| 335592 ||  || — || February 25, 2006 || Kitt Peak || Spacewatch || — || align=right | 2.0 km || 
|-id=593 bgcolor=#E9E9E9
| 335593 ||  || — || February 2, 2006 || Mount Lemmon || Mount Lemmon Survey || — || align=right | 2.8 km || 
|-id=594 bgcolor=#E9E9E9
| 335594 ||  || — || February 25, 2006 || Kitt Peak || Spacewatch || — || align=right | 1.6 km || 
|-id=595 bgcolor=#E9E9E9
| 335595 ||  || — || November 4, 2005 || Kitt Peak || Spacewatch || — || align=right | 3.3 km || 
|-id=596 bgcolor=#E9E9E9
| 335596 ||  || — || February 27, 2006 || Kitt Peak || Spacewatch || — || align=right | 2.5 km || 
|-id=597 bgcolor=#E9E9E9
| 335597 ||  || — || February 27, 2006 || Kitt Peak || Spacewatch || — || align=right | 2.0 km || 
|-id=598 bgcolor=#E9E9E9
| 335598 ||  || — || February 20, 2006 || Catalina || CSS || AGN || align=right | 1.8 km || 
|-id=599 bgcolor=#E9E9E9
| 335599 ||  || — || February 20, 2006 || Mount Lemmon || Mount Lemmon Survey || — || align=right | 2.6 km || 
|-id=600 bgcolor=#E9E9E9
| 335600 ||  || — || March 2, 2006 || Nyukasa || Mount Nyukasa Stn. || — || align=right | 2.8 km || 
|}

335601–335700 

|-bgcolor=#E9E9E9
| 335601 ||  || — || March 2, 2006 || Kitt Peak || Spacewatch || — || align=right | 1.7 km || 
|-id=602 bgcolor=#E9E9E9
| 335602 ||  || — || March 3, 2006 || Kitt Peak || Spacewatch || — || align=right | 1.3 km || 
|-id=603 bgcolor=#E9E9E9
| 335603 ||  || — || January 21, 2006 || Kitt Peak || Spacewatch || — || align=right | 2.4 km || 
|-id=604 bgcolor=#E9E9E9
| 335604 ||  || — || March 3, 2006 || Mount Lemmon || Mount Lemmon Survey || — || align=right | 2.9 km || 
|-id=605 bgcolor=#E9E9E9
| 335605 ||  || — || March 3, 2006 || Kitt Peak || Spacewatch || — || align=right | 2.5 km || 
|-id=606 bgcolor=#E9E9E9
| 335606 ||  || — || March 4, 2006 || Kitt Peak || Spacewatch || — || align=right | 3.0 km || 
|-id=607 bgcolor=#E9E9E9
| 335607 ||  || — || March 4, 2006 || Kitt Peak || Spacewatch || — || align=right | 2.9 km || 
|-id=608 bgcolor=#E9E9E9
| 335608 ||  || — || February 7, 2006 || Kitt Peak || Spacewatch || — || align=right | 2.4 km || 
|-id=609 bgcolor=#E9E9E9
| 335609 ||  || — || March 2, 2006 || Kitt Peak || Spacewatch || AGN || align=right | 1.2 km || 
|-id=610 bgcolor=#E9E9E9
| 335610 ||  || — || March 5, 2006 || Kitt Peak || Spacewatch || — || align=right | 2.3 km || 
|-id=611 bgcolor=#E9E9E9
| 335611 ||  || — || March 2, 2006 || Mount Lemmon || Mount Lemmon Survey || AGN || align=right | 1.5 km || 
|-id=612 bgcolor=#E9E9E9
| 335612 ||  || — || March 5, 2006 || Kitt Peak || Spacewatch || — || align=right | 2.8 km || 
|-id=613 bgcolor=#d6d6d6
| 335613 ||  || — || March 26, 2006 || Siding Spring || SSS || — || align=right | 4.7 km || 
|-id=614 bgcolor=#E9E9E9
| 335614 ||  || — || March 23, 2006 || Mount Lemmon || Mount Lemmon Survey || — || align=right | 2.2 km || 
|-id=615 bgcolor=#E9E9E9
| 335615 ||  || — || March 23, 2006 || Kitt Peak || Spacewatch || — || align=right | 2.8 km || 
|-id=616 bgcolor=#E9E9E9
| 335616 ||  || — || March 25, 2006 || Mount Lemmon || Mount Lemmon Survey || — || align=right | 2.7 km || 
|-id=617 bgcolor=#E9E9E9
| 335617 ||  || — || March 26, 2006 || Mount Lemmon || Mount Lemmon Survey || — || align=right | 3.0 km || 
|-id=618 bgcolor=#d6d6d6
| 335618 ||  || — || March 23, 2006 || Kitt Peak || Spacewatch || KAR || align=right | 1.2 km || 
|-id=619 bgcolor=#E9E9E9
| 335619 ||  || — || April 2, 2006 || Mount Lemmon || Mount Lemmon Survey || — || align=right | 3.4 km || 
|-id=620 bgcolor=#d6d6d6
| 335620 ||  || — || April 2, 2006 || Kitt Peak || Spacewatch || Tj (2.97) || align=right | 3.6 km || 
|-id=621 bgcolor=#E9E9E9
| 335621 ||  || — || April 8, 2006 || Mount Lemmon || Mount Lemmon Survey || AGN || align=right | 1.3 km || 
|-id=622 bgcolor=#d6d6d6
| 335622 ||  || — || April 19, 2006 || Anderson Mesa || LONEOS || — || align=right | 2.9 km || 
|-id=623 bgcolor=#E9E9E9
| 335623 ||  || — || April 19, 2006 || Mount Lemmon || Mount Lemmon Survey || — || align=right | 2.4 km || 
|-id=624 bgcolor=#d6d6d6
| 335624 ||  || — || April 20, 2006 || Kitt Peak || Spacewatch || — || align=right | 3.4 km || 
|-id=625 bgcolor=#d6d6d6
| 335625 ||  || — || April 20, 2006 || Kitt Peak || Spacewatch || — || align=right | 3.1 km || 
|-id=626 bgcolor=#E9E9E9
| 335626 ||  || — || April 24, 2006 || Reedy Creek || J. Broughton || — || align=right | 3.3 km || 
|-id=627 bgcolor=#d6d6d6
| 335627 ||  || — || April 24, 2006 || Kitt Peak || Spacewatch || KOR || align=right | 1.4 km || 
|-id=628 bgcolor=#d6d6d6
| 335628 ||  || — || April 24, 2006 || Mount Lemmon || Mount Lemmon Survey || — || align=right | 4.2 km || 
|-id=629 bgcolor=#d6d6d6
| 335629 ||  || — || April 29, 2006 || Kitt Peak || Spacewatch || — || align=right | 3.6 km || 
|-id=630 bgcolor=#d6d6d6
| 335630 ||  || — || May 2, 2006 || Mount Lemmon || Mount Lemmon Survey || — || align=right | 2.8 km || 
|-id=631 bgcolor=#d6d6d6
| 335631 ||  || — || May 1, 2006 || Kitt Peak || Spacewatch || — || align=right | 3.5 km || 
|-id=632 bgcolor=#d6d6d6
| 335632 ||  || — || May 2, 2006 || Mount Lemmon || Mount Lemmon Survey || KOR || align=right | 1.9 km || 
|-id=633 bgcolor=#d6d6d6
| 335633 ||  || — || May 2, 2006 || Kitt Peak || Spacewatch || — || align=right | 3.2 km || 
|-id=634 bgcolor=#d6d6d6
| 335634 ||  || — || April 24, 2006 || Kitt Peak || Spacewatch || — || align=right | 3.0 km || 
|-id=635 bgcolor=#d6d6d6
| 335635 ||  || — || May 2, 2006 || Kitt Peak || Spacewatch || — || align=right | 3.0 km || 
|-id=636 bgcolor=#d6d6d6
| 335636 ||  || — || May 4, 2006 || Kitt Peak || Spacewatch || — || align=right | 2.7 km || 
|-id=637 bgcolor=#d6d6d6
| 335637 ||  || — || May 19, 2006 || Mount Lemmon || Mount Lemmon Survey || THM || align=right | 2.7 km || 
|-id=638 bgcolor=#d6d6d6
| 335638 ||  || — || May 22, 2006 || Kitt Peak || Spacewatch || — || align=right | 3.4 km || 
|-id=639 bgcolor=#d6d6d6
| 335639 ||  || — || May 22, 2006 || Kitt Peak || Spacewatch || — || align=right | 3.9 km || 
|-id=640 bgcolor=#E9E9E9
| 335640 ||  || — || May 20, 2006 || Kitt Peak || Spacewatch || — || align=right | 2.7 km || 
|-id=641 bgcolor=#d6d6d6
| 335641 ||  || — || May 20, 2006 || Kitt Peak || Spacewatch || KOR || align=right | 1.6 km || 
|-id=642 bgcolor=#d6d6d6
| 335642 ||  || — || May 21, 2006 || Kitt Peak || Spacewatch || — || align=right | 2.2 km || 
|-id=643 bgcolor=#d6d6d6
| 335643 ||  || — || May 6, 2006 || Mount Lemmon || Mount Lemmon Survey || THM || align=right | 2.2 km || 
|-id=644 bgcolor=#d6d6d6
| 335644 ||  || — || May 21, 2006 || Kitt Peak || Spacewatch || JLI || align=right | 3.6 km || 
|-id=645 bgcolor=#d6d6d6
| 335645 ||  || — || May 21, 2006 || Kitt Peak || Spacewatch || — || align=right | 3.3 km || 
|-id=646 bgcolor=#d6d6d6
| 335646 ||  || — || May 23, 2006 || Kitt Peak || Spacewatch || — || align=right | 2.7 km || 
|-id=647 bgcolor=#d6d6d6
| 335647 ||  || — || May 22, 2006 || Kitt Peak || Spacewatch || — || align=right | 2.6 km || 
|-id=648 bgcolor=#d6d6d6
| 335648 ||  || — || May 31, 2006 || Mount Lemmon || Mount Lemmon Survey || EOS || align=right | 1.8 km || 
|-id=649 bgcolor=#d6d6d6
| 335649 ||  || — || May 31, 2006 || Kitt Peak || Spacewatch || EOS || align=right | 2.0 km || 
|-id=650 bgcolor=#d6d6d6
| 335650 ||  || — || June 15, 2006 || Kitt Peak || Spacewatch || — || align=right | 4.2 km || 
|-id=651 bgcolor=#d6d6d6
| 335651 ||  || — || August 25, 1995 || Kitt Peak || Spacewatch || THB || align=right | 3.9 km || 
|-id=652 bgcolor=#d6d6d6
| 335652 ||  || — || July 20, 2006 || Palomar || NEAT || — || align=right | 4.6 km || 
|-id=653 bgcolor=#d6d6d6
| 335653 ||  || — || August 12, 2006 || Palomar || NEAT || — || align=right | 6.8 km || 
|-id=654 bgcolor=#d6d6d6
| 335654 ||  || — || August 14, 2006 || Reedy Creek || J. Broughton || EUP || align=right | 6.5 km || 
|-id=655 bgcolor=#d6d6d6
| 335655 ||  || — || August 12, 2006 || Palomar || NEAT || — || align=right | 4.1 km || 
|-id=656 bgcolor=#d6d6d6
| 335656 ||  || — || August 19, 2006 || Kitt Peak || Spacewatch || ALA || align=right | 5.6 km || 
|-id=657 bgcolor=#d6d6d6
| 335657 ||  || — || August 18, 2006 || Socorro || LINEAR || — || align=right | 5.6 km || 
|-id=658 bgcolor=#d6d6d6
| 335658 ||  || — || August 21, 2006 || Kitt Peak || Spacewatch || — || align=right | 3.0 km || 
|-id=659 bgcolor=#d6d6d6
| 335659 ||  || — || September 14, 2006 || Kitt Peak || Spacewatch || — || align=right | 3.9 km || 
|-id=660 bgcolor=#d6d6d6
| 335660 ||  || — || September 16, 2006 || Catalina || CSS || 7:4 || align=right | 6.0 km || 
|-id=661 bgcolor=#d6d6d6
| 335661 ||  || — || September 19, 2006 || Anderson Mesa || LONEOS || EOS || align=right | 2.3 km || 
|-id=662 bgcolor=#d6d6d6
| 335662 ||  || — || September 17, 2006 || Catalina || CSS || — || align=right | 4.5 km || 
|-id=663 bgcolor=#d6d6d6
| 335663 ||  || — || September 20, 2006 || Anderson Mesa || LONEOS || 7:4 || align=right | 5.2 km || 
|-id=664 bgcolor=#fefefe
| 335664 ||  || — || September 21, 2006 || Anderson Mesa || LONEOS || — || align=right data-sort-value="0.73" | 730 m || 
|-id=665 bgcolor=#d6d6d6
| 335665 ||  || — || September 19, 2006 || Kitt Peak || Spacewatch || — || align=right | 3.3 km || 
|-id=666 bgcolor=#d6d6d6
| 335666 ||  || — || September 25, 2006 || Kitt Peak || Spacewatch || 7:4 || align=right | 6.5 km || 
|-id=667 bgcolor=#fefefe
| 335667 ||  || — || September 27, 2006 || Kitt Peak || Spacewatch || — || align=right data-sort-value="0.67" | 670 m || 
|-id=668 bgcolor=#fefefe
| 335668 ||  || — || September 24, 2006 || Moletai || Molėtai Obs. || — || align=right data-sort-value="0.55" | 550 m || 
|-id=669 bgcolor=#fefefe
| 335669 ||  || — || October 11, 2006 || Kitt Peak || Spacewatch || — || align=right data-sort-value="0.62" | 620 m || 
|-id=670 bgcolor=#fefefe
| 335670 ||  || — || October 11, 2006 || Kitt Peak || Spacewatch || — || align=right data-sort-value="0.80" | 800 m || 
|-id=671 bgcolor=#fefefe
| 335671 ||  || — || October 13, 2006 || Kitt Peak || Spacewatch || — || align=right data-sort-value="0.64" | 640 m || 
|-id=672 bgcolor=#fefefe
| 335672 ||  || — || October 16, 2006 || Kitt Peak || Spacewatch || — || align=right data-sort-value="0.75" | 750 m || 
|-id=673 bgcolor=#fefefe
| 335673 ||  || — || October 27, 2006 || Mount Lemmon || Mount Lemmon Survey || — || align=right data-sort-value="0.67" | 670 m || 
|-id=674 bgcolor=#fefefe
| 335674 ||  || — || October 27, 2006 || Mount Lemmon || Mount Lemmon Survey || FLO || align=right data-sort-value="0.56" | 560 m || 
|-id=675 bgcolor=#fefefe
| 335675 ||  || — || October 28, 2006 || Kitt Peak || Spacewatch || — || align=right data-sort-value="0.73" | 730 m || 
|-id=676 bgcolor=#fefefe
| 335676 ||  || — || October 28, 2006 || Mount Lemmon || Mount Lemmon Survey || — || align=right data-sort-value="0.74" | 740 m || 
|-id=677 bgcolor=#fefefe
| 335677 ||  || — || October 28, 2006 || Mount Lemmon || Mount Lemmon Survey || — || align=right | 1.5 km || 
|-id=678 bgcolor=#fefefe
| 335678 ||  || — || October 19, 2006 || Catalina || CSS || — || align=right data-sort-value="0.94" | 940 m || 
|-id=679 bgcolor=#fefefe
| 335679 ||  || — || November 9, 2006 || Kitt Peak || Spacewatch || — || align=right data-sort-value="0.59" | 590 m || 
|-id=680 bgcolor=#fefefe
| 335680 ||  || — || November 10, 2006 || Kitt Peak || Spacewatch || — || align=right data-sort-value="0.58" | 580 m || 
|-id=681 bgcolor=#fefefe
| 335681 ||  || — || November 11, 2006 || Kitt Peak || Spacewatch || — || align=right data-sort-value="0.94" | 940 m || 
|-id=682 bgcolor=#fefefe
| 335682 ||  || — || November 11, 2006 || Kitt Peak || Spacewatch || — || align=right | 1.0 km || 
|-id=683 bgcolor=#fefefe
| 335683 ||  || — || November 11, 2006 || Kitt Peak || Spacewatch || — || align=right data-sort-value="0.90" | 900 m || 
|-id=684 bgcolor=#fefefe
| 335684 ||  || — || October 22, 2006 || Catalina || CSS || — || align=right | 1.0 km || 
|-id=685 bgcolor=#fefefe
| 335685 ||  || — || August 18, 2002 || Palomar || NEAT || — || align=right data-sort-value="0.91" | 910 m || 
|-id=686 bgcolor=#fefefe
| 335686 ||  || — || November 11, 2006 || Kitt Peak || Spacewatch || — || align=right | 1.0 km || 
|-id=687 bgcolor=#fefefe
| 335687 ||  || — || April 16, 2005 || Kitt Peak || Spacewatch || NYS || align=right data-sort-value="0.81" | 810 m || 
|-id=688 bgcolor=#fefefe
| 335688 ||  || — || November 16, 2006 || Mount Lemmon || Mount Lemmon Survey || V || align=right data-sort-value="0.89" | 890 m || 
|-id=689 bgcolor=#fefefe
| 335689 ||  || — || November 19, 2006 || Kitt Peak || Spacewatch || — || align=right data-sort-value="0.78" | 780 m || 
|-id=690 bgcolor=#fefefe
| 335690 ||  || — || November 27, 2006 || 7300 Observatory || W. K. Y. Yeung || — || align=right | 1.2 km || 
|-id=691 bgcolor=#fefefe
| 335691 ||  || — || November 21, 2006 || Mount Lemmon || Mount Lemmon Survey || V || align=right data-sort-value="0.60" | 600 m || 
|-id=692 bgcolor=#fefefe
| 335692 ||  || — || November 22, 2006 || Kitt Peak || Spacewatch || — || align=right data-sort-value="0.92" | 920 m || 
|-id=693 bgcolor=#fefefe
| 335693 ||  || — || November 23, 2006 || Kitt Peak || Spacewatch || — || align=right data-sort-value="0.59" | 590 m || 
|-id=694 bgcolor=#fefefe
| 335694 ||  || — || November 27, 2006 || Kitt Peak || Spacewatch || — || align=right data-sort-value="0.63" | 630 m || 
|-id=695 bgcolor=#fefefe
| 335695 ||  || — || November 28, 2006 || Mount Lemmon || Mount Lemmon Survey || — || align=right data-sort-value="0.87" | 870 m || 
|-id=696 bgcolor=#fefefe
| 335696 ||  || — || November 16, 2006 || Mount Lemmon || Mount Lemmon Survey || V || align=right data-sort-value="0.87" | 870 m || 
|-id=697 bgcolor=#fefefe
| 335697 ||  || — || December 11, 2006 || 7300 || W. K. Y. Yeung || — || align=right data-sort-value="0.71" | 710 m || 
|-id=698 bgcolor=#fefefe
| 335698 ||  || — || December 11, 2006 || Kitt Peak || Spacewatch || — || align=right data-sort-value="0.65" | 650 m || 
|-id=699 bgcolor=#fefefe
| 335699 ||  || — || December 14, 2006 || Mount Lemmon || Mount Lemmon Survey || — || align=right data-sort-value="0.90" | 900 m || 
|-id=700 bgcolor=#fefefe
| 335700 ||  || — || December 15, 2006 || Kitt Peak || Spacewatch || V || align=right data-sort-value="0.78" | 780 m || 
|}

335701–335800 

|-bgcolor=#fefefe
| 335701 ||  || — || December 21, 2006 || Catalina || CSS || FLO || align=right data-sort-value="0.73" | 730 m || 
|-id=702 bgcolor=#fefefe
| 335702 ||  || — || December 20, 2006 || Palomar || NEAT || — || align=right data-sort-value="0.82" | 820 m || 
|-id=703 bgcolor=#fefefe
| 335703 ||  || — || December 21, 2006 || Kitt Peak || Spacewatch || — || align=right | 1.2 km || 
|-id=704 bgcolor=#fefefe
| 335704 ||  || — || December 27, 2006 || Mount Lemmon || Mount Lemmon Survey || — || align=right | 1.1 km || 
|-id=705 bgcolor=#fefefe
| 335705 ||  || — || January 8, 2007 || Mount Lemmon || Mount Lemmon Survey || PHO || align=right | 1.6 km || 
|-id=706 bgcolor=#fefefe
| 335706 ||  || — || January 8, 2007 || Kitt Peak || Spacewatch || — || align=right data-sort-value="0.94" | 940 m || 
|-id=707 bgcolor=#fefefe
| 335707 ||  || — || January 8, 2007 || Catalina || CSS || FLO || align=right data-sort-value="0.80" | 800 m || 
|-id=708 bgcolor=#fefefe
| 335708 ||  || — || January 9, 2007 || Kitt Peak || Spacewatch || MAS || align=right data-sort-value="0.80" | 800 m || 
|-id=709 bgcolor=#fefefe
| 335709 ||  || — || January 17, 2007 || Kitt Peak || Spacewatch || — || align=right data-sort-value="0.83" | 830 m || 
|-id=710 bgcolor=#fefefe
| 335710 ||  || — || January 24, 2007 || Catalina || CSS || — || align=right data-sort-value="0.98" | 980 m || 
|-id=711 bgcolor=#fefefe
| 335711 ||  || — || January 26, 2007 || Kitt Peak || Spacewatch || V || align=right | 1.0 km || 
|-id=712 bgcolor=#fefefe
| 335712 ||  || — || January 17, 2007 || Kitt Peak || Spacewatch || — || align=right data-sort-value="0.65" | 650 m || 
|-id=713 bgcolor=#fefefe
| 335713 ||  || — || January 26, 2007 || Kitt Peak || Spacewatch || — || align=right | 1.2 km || 
|-id=714 bgcolor=#fefefe
| 335714 ||  || — || February 6, 2007 || Mount Lemmon || Mount Lemmon Survey || — || align=right data-sort-value="0.67" | 670 m || 
|-id=715 bgcolor=#fefefe
| 335715 ||  || — || February 6, 2007 || Kitt Peak || Spacewatch || — || align=right | 1.4 km || 
|-id=716 bgcolor=#fefefe
| 335716 ||  || — || February 6, 2007 || Kitt Peak || Spacewatch || V || align=right data-sort-value="0.67" | 670 m || 
|-id=717 bgcolor=#fefefe
| 335717 ||  || — || February 8, 2007 || Kitt Peak || Spacewatch || — || align=right | 1.7 km || 
|-id=718 bgcolor=#fefefe
| 335718 ||  || — || December 27, 2006 || Mount Lemmon || Mount Lemmon Survey || V || align=right data-sort-value="0.96" | 960 m || 
|-id=719 bgcolor=#fefefe
| 335719 ||  || — || February 8, 2007 || Catalina || CSS || — || align=right | 1.1 km || 
|-id=720 bgcolor=#fefefe
| 335720 ||  || — || February 6, 2007 || Mount Lemmon || Mount Lemmon Survey || NYS || align=right data-sort-value="0.66" | 660 m || 
|-id=721 bgcolor=#fefefe
| 335721 ||  || — || January 28, 2007 || Mount Lemmon || Mount Lemmon Survey || — || align=right data-sort-value="0.87" | 870 m || 
|-id=722 bgcolor=#fefefe
| 335722 ||  || — || February 15, 2007 || Palomar || NEAT || — || align=right | 1.0 km || 
|-id=723 bgcolor=#fefefe
| 335723 ||  || — || February 10, 2007 || Catalina || CSS || V || align=right data-sort-value="0.95" | 950 m || 
|-id=724 bgcolor=#fefefe
| 335724 ||  || — || January 17, 2007 || Kitt Peak || Spacewatch || V || align=right data-sort-value="0.83" | 830 m || 
|-id=725 bgcolor=#fefefe
| 335725 ||  || — || February 20, 2007 || Vicques || M. Ory || NYS || align=right data-sort-value="0.68" | 680 m || 
|-id=726 bgcolor=#fefefe
| 335726 ||  || — || February 17, 2007 || Kitt Peak || Spacewatch || V || align=right data-sort-value="0.87" | 870 m || 
|-id=727 bgcolor=#E9E9E9
| 335727 ||  || — || February 17, 2007 || Kitt Peak || Spacewatch || — || align=right | 1.3 km || 
|-id=728 bgcolor=#E9E9E9
| 335728 ||  || — || February 17, 2007 || Kitt Peak || Spacewatch || — || align=right | 1.5 km || 
|-id=729 bgcolor=#E9E9E9
| 335729 ||  || — || February 17, 2007 || Mount Lemmon || Mount Lemmon Survey || — || align=right data-sort-value="0.97" | 970 m || 
|-id=730 bgcolor=#C2FFFF
| 335730 ||  || — || February 17, 2007 || Kitt Peak || Spacewatch || L5 || align=right | 10 km || 
|-id=731 bgcolor=#fefefe
| 335731 ||  || — || February 21, 2007 || Kitt Peak || Spacewatch || — || align=right data-sort-value="0.86" | 860 m || 
|-id=732 bgcolor=#fefefe
| 335732 ||  || — || February 16, 2007 || Palomar || NEAT || MAS || align=right data-sort-value="0.78" | 780 m || 
|-id=733 bgcolor=#E9E9E9
| 335733 ||  || — || January 30, 2007 || Siding Spring || SSS || — || align=right | 2.0 km || 
|-id=734 bgcolor=#fefefe
| 335734 ||  || — || February 23, 2007 || Mount Lemmon || Mount Lemmon Survey || MAS || align=right data-sort-value="0.73" | 730 m || 
|-id=735 bgcolor=#fefefe
| 335735 ||  || — || February 23, 2007 || Mount Lemmon || Mount Lemmon Survey || V || align=right data-sort-value="0.92" | 920 m || 
|-id=736 bgcolor=#fefefe
| 335736 ||  || — || February 23, 2007 || Mount Lemmon || Mount Lemmon Survey || — || align=right data-sort-value="0.77" | 770 m || 
|-id=737 bgcolor=#fefefe
| 335737 ||  || — || February 24, 2007 || Nyukasa || Mount Nyukasa Stn. || — || align=right | 1.1 km || 
|-id=738 bgcolor=#E9E9E9
| 335738 ||  || — || February 23, 2007 || Mount Lemmon || Mount Lemmon Survey || — || align=right data-sort-value="0.95" | 950 m || 
|-id=739 bgcolor=#C2FFFF
| 335739 ||  || — || February 27, 2007 || Kitt Peak || Spacewatch || L5 || align=right | 9.1 km || 
|-id=740 bgcolor=#E9E9E9
| 335740 ||  || — || March 9, 2007 || Kitt Peak || Spacewatch || — || align=right | 1.1 km || 
|-id=741 bgcolor=#fefefe
| 335741 ||  || — || March 9, 2007 || Mount Lemmon || Mount Lemmon Survey || — || align=right data-sort-value="0.90" | 900 m || 
|-id=742 bgcolor=#fefefe
| 335742 ||  || — || January 27, 2007 || Mount Lemmon || Mount Lemmon Survey || NYS || align=right data-sort-value="0.82" | 820 m || 
|-id=743 bgcolor=#fefefe
| 335743 ||  || — || March 9, 2007 || Kitt Peak || Spacewatch || — || align=right | 1.2 km || 
|-id=744 bgcolor=#E9E9E9
| 335744 ||  || — || March 9, 2007 || Kitt Peak || Spacewatch || — || align=right | 1.5 km || 
|-id=745 bgcolor=#fefefe
| 335745 ||  || — || February 23, 2007 || Mount Lemmon || Mount Lemmon Survey || — || align=right | 1.1 km || 
|-id=746 bgcolor=#FFC2E0
| 335746 ||  || — || March 11, 2007 || Catalina || CSS || AMO +1km || align=right data-sort-value="0.78" | 780 m || 
|-id=747 bgcolor=#fefefe
| 335747 ||  || — || March 12, 2007 || Mount Lemmon || Mount Lemmon Survey || — || align=right | 1.1 km || 
|-id=748 bgcolor=#fefefe
| 335748 ||  || — || March 9, 2007 || Kitt Peak || Spacewatch || NYS || align=right data-sort-value="0.72" | 720 m || 
|-id=749 bgcolor=#fefefe
| 335749 ||  || — || March 9, 2007 || Mount Lemmon || Mount Lemmon Survey || — || align=right | 1.1 km || 
|-id=750 bgcolor=#E9E9E9
| 335750 ||  || — || March 10, 2007 || Kitt Peak || Spacewatch || — || align=right data-sort-value="0.96" | 960 m || 
|-id=751 bgcolor=#fefefe
| 335751 ||  || — || March 11, 2007 || Mount Lemmon || Mount Lemmon Survey || — || align=right data-sort-value="0.75" | 750 m || 
|-id=752 bgcolor=#fefefe
| 335752 ||  || — || March 12, 2007 || Mount Lemmon || Mount Lemmon Survey || LCI || align=right | 1.2 km || 
|-id=753 bgcolor=#E9E9E9
| 335753 ||  || — || March 10, 2007 || Mount Lemmon || Mount Lemmon Survey || — || align=right | 1.0 km || 
|-id=754 bgcolor=#fefefe
| 335754 ||  || — || March 10, 2007 || Mount Lemmon || Mount Lemmon Survey || SUL || align=right | 2.7 km || 
|-id=755 bgcolor=#E9E9E9
| 335755 ||  || — || March 10, 2007 || Kitt Peak || Spacewatch || — || align=right | 1.7 km || 
|-id=756 bgcolor=#fefefe
| 335756 ||  || — || March 12, 2007 || Kitt Peak || Spacewatch || — || align=right data-sort-value="0.62" | 620 m || 
|-id=757 bgcolor=#E9E9E9
| 335757 ||  || — || March 13, 2007 || Catalina || CSS || — || align=right | 1.3 km || 
|-id=758 bgcolor=#FFC2E0
| 335758 ||  || — || March 15, 2007 || Kitt Peak || Spacewatch || AMO || align=right data-sort-value="0.43" | 430 m || 
|-id=759 bgcolor=#fefefe
| 335759 ||  || — || March 10, 2007 || Kitt Peak || Spacewatch || — || align=right | 1.3 km || 
|-id=760 bgcolor=#fefefe
| 335760 ||  || — || March 11, 2007 || Mount Lemmon || Mount Lemmon Survey || — || align=right data-sort-value="0.80" | 800 m || 
|-id=761 bgcolor=#E9E9E9
| 335761 ||  || — || March 11, 2007 || Mount Lemmon || Mount Lemmon Survey || JUN || align=right data-sort-value="0.89" | 890 m || 
|-id=762 bgcolor=#fefefe
| 335762 ||  || — || February 11, 2003 || Haleakala || NEAT || — || align=right | 1.3 km || 
|-id=763 bgcolor=#E9E9E9
| 335763 ||  || — || March 13, 2007 || Mount Lemmon || Mount Lemmon Survey || — || align=right | 1.2 km || 
|-id=764 bgcolor=#E9E9E9
| 335764 ||  || — || February 21, 2007 || Mount Lemmon || Mount Lemmon Survey || — || align=right | 2.3 km || 
|-id=765 bgcolor=#E9E9E9
| 335765 ||  || — || March 13, 2007 || Mount Lemmon || Mount Lemmon Survey || — || align=right | 1.2 km || 
|-id=766 bgcolor=#C2FFFF
| 335766 ||  || — || March 12, 2007 || Kitt Peak || Spacewatch || L5 || align=right | 9.2 km || 
|-id=767 bgcolor=#C2FFFF
| 335767 ||  || — || March 12, 2007 || Mount Lemmon || Mount Lemmon Survey || L5 || align=right | 8.9 km || 
|-id=768 bgcolor=#E9E9E9
| 335768 ||  || — || March 12, 2007 || Mount Lemmon || Mount Lemmon Survey || — || align=right data-sort-value="0.84" | 840 m || 
|-id=769 bgcolor=#E9E9E9
| 335769 ||  || — || February 26, 2007 || Mount Lemmon || Mount Lemmon Survey || — || align=right data-sort-value="0.88" | 880 m || 
|-id=770 bgcolor=#E9E9E9
| 335770 ||  || — || March 12, 2007 || Kitt Peak || Spacewatch || — || align=right | 1.7 km || 
|-id=771 bgcolor=#E9E9E9
| 335771 ||  || — || March 14, 2007 || Siding Spring || SSS || — || align=right | 2.9 km || 
|-id=772 bgcolor=#FA8072
| 335772 ||  || — || March 10, 2007 || Kitt Peak || Spacewatch || — || align=right data-sort-value="0.79" | 790 m || 
|-id=773 bgcolor=#fefefe
| 335773 ||  || — || March 14, 2007 || Kitt Peak || Spacewatch || V || align=right data-sort-value="0.81" | 810 m || 
|-id=774 bgcolor=#E9E9E9
| 335774 ||  || — || March 14, 2007 || Kitt Peak || Spacewatch || — || align=right | 2.6 km || 
|-id=775 bgcolor=#E9E9E9
| 335775 ||  || — || March 14, 2007 || Kitt Peak || Spacewatch || — || align=right | 1.5 km || 
|-id=776 bgcolor=#E9E9E9
| 335776 ||  || — || March 14, 2007 || Catalina || CSS || — || align=right | 2.2 km || 
|-id=777 bgcolor=#E9E9E9
| 335777 ||  || — || March 14, 2007 || Catalina || CSS || — || align=right | 2.6 km || 
|-id=778 bgcolor=#E9E9E9
| 335778 ||  || — || March 10, 2007 || Mount Lemmon || Mount Lemmon Survey || — || align=right | 1.0 km || 
|-id=779 bgcolor=#E9E9E9
| 335779 ||  || — || March 9, 2007 || Mount Lemmon || Mount Lemmon Survey || — || align=right data-sort-value="0.91" | 910 m || 
|-id=780 bgcolor=#E9E9E9
| 335780 ||  || — || March 13, 2007 || Catalina || CSS || JUN || align=right | 1.2 km || 
|-id=781 bgcolor=#E9E9E9
| 335781 ||  || — || March 10, 2007 || Mount Lemmon || Mount Lemmon Survey || — || align=right data-sort-value="0.81" | 810 m || 
|-id=782 bgcolor=#fefefe
| 335782 ||  || — || March 19, 2007 || La Sagra || OAM Obs. || NYS || align=right data-sort-value="0.62" | 620 m || 
|-id=783 bgcolor=#E9E9E9
| 335783 ||  || — || March 16, 2007 || Kitt Peak || Spacewatch || — || align=right | 1.6 km || 
|-id=784 bgcolor=#E9E9E9
| 335784 ||  || — || March 19, 2007 || Anderson Mesa || LONEOS || — || align=right | 1.2 km || 
|-id=785 bgcolor=#fefefe
| 335785 ||  || — || March 20, 2007 || Mount Lemmon || Mount Lemmon Survey || V || align=right data-sort-value="0.82" | 820 m || 
|-id=786 bgcolor=#fefefe
| 335786 ||  || — || March 25, 2007 || Mount Lemmon || Mount Lemmon Survey || MAS || align=right data-sort-value="0.71" | 710 m || 
|-id=787 bgcolor=#E9E9E9
| 335787 ||  || — || March 26, 2007 || Kitt Peak || Spacewatch || RAF || align=right | 1.2 km || 
|-id=788 bgcolor=#E9E9E9
| 335788 ||  || — || April 7, 2007 || Catalina || CSS || — || align=right | 3.7 km || 
|-id=789 bgcolor=#C2FFFF
| 335789 ||  || — || April 11, 2007 || Kitt Peak || Spacewatch || L5 || align=right | 7.9 km || 
|-id=790 bgcolor=#E9E9E9
| 335790 ||  || — || April 14, 2007 || Kitt Peak || Spacewatch || — || align=right | 2.0 km || 
|-id=791 bgcolor=#E9E9E9
| 335791 ||  || — || April 14, 2007 || Kitt Peak || Spacewatch || MRX || align=right | 1.3 km || 
|-id=792 bgcolor=#E9E9E9
| 335792 ||  || — || April 11, 2007 || Catalina || CSS || — || align=right | 2.2 km || 
|-id=793 bgcolor=#E9E9E9
| 335793 ||  || — || April 15, 2007 || Kitt Peak || Spacewatch || — || align=right | 1.5 km || 
|-id=794 bgcolor=#E9E9E9
| 335794 ||  || — || April 15, 2007 || Kitt Peak || Spacewatch || — || align=right | 1.5 km || 
|-id=795 bgcolor=#E9E9E9
| 335795 ||  || — || April 15, 2007 || Kitt Peak || Spacewatch || — || align=right | 1.0 km || 
|-id=796 bgcolor=#E9E9E9
| 335796 ||  || — || April 15, 2007 || Catalina || CSS || — || align=right | 1.9 km || 
|-id=797 bgcolor=#E9E9E9
| 335797 ||  || — || April 16, 2007 || Catalina || CSS || JUN || align=right | 1.2 km || 
|-id=798 bgcolor=#E9E9E9
| 335798 ||  || — || April 19, 2007 || Pises || Pises Obs. || — || align=right | 1.1 km || 
|-id=799 bgcolor=#E9E9E9
| 335799 Zonglü ||  ||  || April 19, 2007 || Lulin Observatory || Q.-z. Ye, H.-C. Lin || — || align=right | 2.2 km || 
|-id=800 bgcolor=#E9E9E9
| 335800 ||  || — || April 18, 2007 || Kitt Peak || Spacewatch || — || align=right | 2.2 km || 
|}

335801–335900 

|-bgcolor=#E9E9E9
| 335801 ||  || — || April 20, 2007 || Socorro || LINEAR || EUN || align=right | 2.2 km || 
|-id=802 bgcolor=#E9E9E9
| 335802 ||  || — || April 20, 2007 || Anderson Mesa || LONEOS || EUN || align=right | 1.6 km || 
|-id=803 bgcolor=#E9E9E9
| 335803 ||  || — || April 18, 2007 || Mount Lemmon || Mount Lemmon Survey || EUN || align=right | 1.2 km || 
|-id=804 bgcolor=#E9E9E9
| 335804 ||  || — || April 22, 2007 || Mount Lemmon || Mount Lemmon Survey || — || align=right | 1.8 km || 
|-id=805 bgcolor=#E9E9E9
| 335805 ||  || — || April 25, 2007 || Kitt Peak || Spacewatch || — || align=right | 1.9 km || 
|-id=806 bgcolor=#E9E9E9
| 335806 ||  || — || April 26, 2007 || Kitt Peak || Spacewatch || — || align=right | 2.1 km || 
|-id=807 bgcolor=#E9E9E9
| 335807 ||  || — || April 23, 2007 || Catalina || CSS || — || align=right | 1.9 km || 
|-id=808 bgcolor=#E9E9E9
| 335808 ||  || — || May 7, 2007 || Mount Lemmon || Mount Lemmon Survey || — || align=right | 2.4 km || 
|-id=809 bgcolor=#E9E9E9
| 335809 ||  || — || May 7, 2007 || Kitt Peak || Spacewatch || — || align=right | 1.3 km || 
|-id=810 bgcolor=#E9E9E9
| 335810 ||  || — || May 7, 2007 || Kitt Peak || Spacewatch || — || align=right | 3.0 km || 
|-id=811 bgcolor=#E9E9E9
| 335811 ||  || — || May 9, 2007 || Mount Lemmon || Mount Lemmon Survey || — || align=right | 1.8 km || 
|-id=812 bgcolor=#E9E9E9
| 335812 ||  || — || May 7, 2007 || Kitt Peak || Spacewatch || — || align=right | 1.7 km || 
|-id=813 bgcolor=#E9E9E9
| 335813 ||  || — || May 7, 2007 || Kitt Peak || Spacewatch || — || align=right | 2.2 km || 
|-id=814 bgcolor=#E9E9E9
| 335814 ||  || — || May 7, 2007 || Kitt Peak || Spacewatch || — || align=right | 1.9 km || 
|-id=815 bgcolor=#E9E9E9
| 335815 ||  || — || May 7, 2007 || Mount Lemmon || Mount Lemmon Survey || — || align=right | 2.0 km || 
|-id=816 bgcolor=#E9E9E9
| 335816 ||  || — || May 7, 2007 || Mount Lemmon || Mount Lemmon Survey || MIT || align=right | 2.9 km || 
|-id=817 bgcolor=#E9E9E9
| 335817 ||  || — || May 7, 2007 || Mount Lemmon || Mount Lemmon Survey || — || align=right | 2.8 km || 
|-id=818 bgcolor=#E9E9E9
| 335818 ||  || — || May 7, 2007 || Mount Lemmon || Mount Lemmon Survey || EUN || align=right | 1.3 km || 
|-id=819 bgcolor=#E9E9E9
| 335819 ||  || — || May 9, 2007 || Kitt Peak || Spacewatch || VIB || align=right | 1.6 km || 
|-id=820 bgcolor=#E9E9E9
| 335820 ||  || — || May 10, 2007 || Mount Lemmon || Mount Lemmon Survey || — || align=right | 1.5 km || 
|-id=821 bgcolor=#E9E9E9
| 335821 ||  || — || May 12, 2007 || Mount Lemmon || Mount Lemmon Survey || — || align=right | 2.5 km || 
|-id=822 bgcolor=#E9E9E9
| 335822 ||  || — || May 12, 2007 || Mount Lemmon || Mount Lemmon Survey || MAR || align=right | 1.2 km || 
|-id=823 bgcolor=#E9E9E9
| 335823 ||  || — || April 9, 2007 || Siding Spring || SSS || — || align=right | 2.6 km || 
|-id=824 bgcolor=#E9E9E9
| 335824 ||  || — || May 16, 2007 || Siding Spring || SSS || JUN || align=right | 1.6 km || 
|-id=825 bgcolor=#E9E9E9
| 335825 ||  || — || June 8, 2007 || Kitt Peak || Spacewatch || ADE || align=right | 3.3 km || 
|-id=826 bgcolor=#E9E9E9
| 335826 ||  || — || June 8, 2007 || Kitt Peak || Spacewatch || — || align=right | 1.7 km || 
|-id=827 bgcolor=#E9E9E9
| 335827 ||  || — || June 9, 2007 || Kitt Peak || Spacewatch || — || align=right | 1.5 km || 
|-id=828 bgcolor=#E9E9E9
| 335828 ||  || — || June 7, 2007 || Kitt Peak || Spacewatch || EUN || align=right | 1.4 km || 
|-id=829 bgcolor=#E9E9E9
| 335829 ||  || — || June 8, 2007 || Kitt Peak || Spacewatch || MAR || align=right | 1.1 km || 
|-id=830 bgcolor=#E9E9E9
| 335830 ||  || — || June 8, 2007 || Kitt Peak || Spacewatch || — || align=right | 2.1 km || 
|-id=831 bgcolor=#E9E9E9
| 335831 ||  || — || June 8, 2007 || Kitt Peak || Spacewatch || — || align=right | 1.7 km || 
|-id=832 bgcolor=#E9E9E9
| 335832 ||  || — || January 31, 2006 || Kitt Peak || Spacewatch || — || align=right | 1.5 km || 
|-id=833 bgcolor=#E9E9E9
| 335833 ||  || — || June 10, 2007 || Kitt Peak || Spacewatch || — || align=right | 1.8 km || 
|-id=834 bgcolor=#E9E9E9
| 335834 ||  || — || June 9, 2007 || Kitt Peak || Spacewatch || — || align=right | 2.4 km || 
|-id=835 bgcolor=#E9E9E9
| 335835 ||  || — || June 14, 2007 || Kitt Peak || Spacewatch || ADE || align=right | 1.7 km || 
|-id=836 bgcolor=#E9E9E9
| 335836 ||  || — || June 15, 2007 || Kitt Peak || Spacewatch || — || align=right | 2.4 km || 
|-id=837 bgcolor=#E9E9E9
| 335837 ||  || — || June 15, 2007 || Kitt Peak || Spacewatch || — || align=right | 2.5 km || 
|-id=838 bgcolor=#E9E9E9
| 335838 ||  || — || June 9, 2007 || Kitt Peak || Spacewatch || — || align=right | 1.7 km || 
|-id=839 bgcolor=#E9E9E9
| 335839 ||  || — || June 16, 2007 || Kitt Peak || Spacewatch || — || align=right | 2.4 km || 
|-id=840 bgcolor=#E9E9E9
| 335840 ||  || — || June 16, 2007 || Kitt Peak || Spacewatch || — || align=right | 3.0 km || 
|-id=841 bgcolor=#E9E9E9
| 335841 ||  || — || June 16, 2007 || Kitt Peak || Spacewatch || — || align=right | 1.5 km || 
|-id=842 bgcolor=#E9E9E9
| 335842 ||  || — || June 17, 2007 || Kitt Peak || Spacewatch || — || align=right | 2.0 km || 
|-id=843 bgcolor=#d6d6d6
| 335843 ||  || — || June 21, 2007 || Tiki || S. F. Hönig, N. Teamo || — || align=right | 4.6 km || 
|-id=844 bgcolor=#E9E9E9
| 335844 ||  || — || June 19, 2007 || Kitt Peak || Spacewatch || — || align=right | 1.9 km || 
|-id=845 bgcolor=#fefefe
| 335845 ||  || — || June 23, 2007 || Kitt Peak || Spacewatch || — || align=right | 1.4 km || 
|-id=846 bgcolor=#E9E9E9
| 335846 ||  || — || June 22, 2007 || Kitt Peak || Spacewatch || — || align=right | 4.3 km || 
|-id=847 bgcolor=#d6d6d6
| 335847 ||  || — || July 18, 2007 || Mount Lemmon || Mount Lemmon Survey || — || align=right | 3.4 km || 
|-id=848 bgcolor=#d6d6d6
| 335848 ||  || — || August 12, 2007 || Socorro || LINEAR || — || align=right | 4.1 km || 
|-id=849 bgcolor=#d6d6d6
| 335849 ||  || — || August 10, 2007 || Kitt Peak || Spacewatch || — || align=right | 2.9 km || 
|-id=850 bgcolor=#d6d6d6
| 335850 ||  || — || August 17, 2007 || Purple Mountain || PMO NEO || — || align=right | 3.2 km || 
|-id=851 bgcolor=#d6d6d6
| 335851 ||  || — || August 22, 2007 || Goodricke-Pigott || R. A. Tucker || — || align=right | 5.0 km || 
|-id=852 bgcolor=#d6d6d6
| 335852 ||  || — || August 24, 2007 || Kitt Peak || Spacewatch || — || align=right | 4.5 km || 
|-id=853 bgcolor=#d6d6d6
| 335853 Valléedaoste ||  ||  || September 7, 2007 || OAVdA, Saint-Barthelemy || A. Carbognani || HYG || align=right | 3.2 km || 
|-id=854 bgcolor=#fefefe
| 335854 ||  || — || January 4, 2006 || Catalina || CSS || H || align=right data-sort-value="0.77" | 770 m || 
|-id=855 bgcolor=#d6d6d6
| 335855 ||  || — || September 12, 2007 || Altschwendt || W. Ries || — || align=right | 3.3 km || 
|-id=856 bgcolor=#d6d6d6
| 335856 ||  || — || September 21, 2001 || Kitt Peak || Spacewatch || — || align=right | 3.4 km || 
|-id=857 bgcolor=#d6d6d6
| 335857 ||  || — || September 12, 2007 || Dauban || Chante-Perdrix Obs. || — || align=right | 3.4 km || 
|-id=858 bgcolor=#d6d6d6
| 335858 ||  || — || September 3, 2007 || Catalina || CSS || — || align=right | 2.9 km || 
|-id=859 bgcolor=#d6d6d6
| 335859 ||  || — || September 9, 2007 || Kitt Peak || Spacewatch || — || align=right | 3.8 km || 
|-id=860 bgcolor=#d6d6d6
| 335860 ||  || — || September 9, 2007 || Kitt Peak || Spacewatch || HYG || align=right | 3.3 km || 
|-id=861 bgcolor=#d6d6d6
| 335861 ||  || — || September 9, 2007 || Kitt Peak || Spacewatch || EOS || align=right | 2.5 km || 
|-id=862 bgcolor=#d6d6d6
| 335862 ||  || — || September 9, 2007 || Kitt Peak || Spacewatch || — || align=right | 3.4 km || 
|-id=863 bgcolor=#d6d6d6
| 335863 ||  || — || September 9, 2007 || Kitt Peak || Spacewatch || HYG || align=right | 5.5 km || 
|-id=864 bgcolor=#d6d6d6
| 335864 ||  || — || September 9, 2007 || Kitt Peak || Spacewatch || — || align=right | 3.5 km || 
|-id=865 bgcolor=#d6d6d6
| 335865 ||  || — || September 9, 2007 || Kitt Peak || Spacewatch || — || align=right | 2.9 km || 
|-id=866 bgcolor=#d6d6d6
| 335866 ||  || — || September 9, 2007 || Kitt Peak || Spacewatch || HYG || align=right | 2.9 km || 
|-id=867 bgcolor=#d6d6d6
| 335867 ||  || — || September 9, 2007 || Kitt Peak || Spacewatch || — || align=right | 3.4 km || 
|-id=868 bgcolor=#d6d6d6
| 335868 ||  || — || September 10, 2007 || Kitt Peak || Spacewatch || KOR || align=right | 2.0 km || 
|-id=869 bgcolor=#d6d6d6
| 335869 ||  || — || September 10, 2007 || Kitt Peak || Spacewatch || — || align=right | 2.8 km || 
|-id=870 bgcolor=#d6d6d6
| 335870 ||  || — || September 11, 2007 || Mount Lemmon || Mount Lemmon Survey || — || align=right | 2.8 km || 
|-id=871 bgcolor=#d6d6d6
| 335871 ||  || — || September 11, 2007 || Kitt Peak || Spacewatch || — || align=right | 2.6 km || 
|-id=872 bgcolor=#d6d6d6
| 335872 ||  || — || September 11, 2007 || Kitt Peak || Spacewatch || HYG || align=right | 3.2 km || 
|-id=873 bgcolor=#d6d6d6
| 335873 ||  || — || September 11, 2007 || Kitt Peak || Spacewatch || — || align=right | 3.8 km || 
|-id=874 bgcolor=#d6d6d6
| 335874 ||  || — || September 11, 2007 || Kitt Peak || Spacewatch || — || align=right | 3.6 km || 
|-id=875 bgcolor=#d6d6d6
| 335875 ||  || — || September 11, 2007 || Mount Lemmon || Mount Lemmon Survey || — || align=right | 3.1 km || 
|-id=876 bgcolor=#d6d6d6
| 335876 ||  || — || September 12, 2007 || Mount Lemmon || Mount Lemmon Survey || — || align=right | 3.4 km || 
|-id=877 bgcolor=#d6d6d6
| 335877 ||  || — || September 12, 2007 || Mount Lemmon || Mount Lemmon Survey || — || align=right | 2.9 km || 
|-id=878 bgcolor=#d6d6d6
| 335878 ||  || — || September 12, 2007 || Mount Lemmon || Mount Lemmon Survey || HYG || align=right | 3.2 km || 
|-id=879 bgcolor=#d6d6d6
| 335879 ||  || — || September 12, 2007 || Mount Lemmon || Mount Lemmon Survey || — || align=right | 3.0 km || 
|-id=880 bgcolor=#d6d6d6
| 335880 ||  || — || September 14, 2007 || Socorro || LINEAR || TIR || align=right | 3.3 km || 
|-id=881 bgcolor=#d6d6d6
| 335881 ||  || — || September 15, 2007 || Socorro || LINEAR || — || align=right | 3.5 km || 
|-id=882 bgcolor=#d6d6d6
| 335882 ||  || — || September 10, 2007 || Kitt Peak || Spacewatch || — || align=right | 3.9 km || 
|-id=883 bgcolor=#d6d6d6
| 335883 ||  || — || June 23, 1995 || Kitt Peak || Spacewatch || EOS || align=right | 1.9 km || 
|-id=884 bgcolor=#d6d6d6
| 335884 ||  || — || September 10, 2007 || Kitt Peak || Spacewatch || — || align=right | 2.9 km || 
|-id=885 bgcolor=#d6d6d6
| 335885 ||  || — || September 10, 2007 || Kitt Peak || Spacewatch || EOS || align=right | 2.3 km || 
|-id=886 bgcolor=#d6d6d6
| 335886 ||  || — || September 10, 2007 || Kitt Peak || Spacewatch || — || align=right | 3.6 km || 
|-id=887 bgcolor=#d6d6d6
| 335887 ||  || — || September 10, 2007 || Kitt Peak || Spacewatch || — || align=right | 3.1 km || 
|-id=888 bgcolor=#d6d6d6
| 335888 ||  || — || September 10, 2007 || Kitt Peak || Spacewatch || — || align=right | 2.7 km || 
|-id=889 bgcolor=#FA8072
| 335889 ||  || — || September 11, 2007 || Catalina || CSS || H || align=right data-sort-value="0.63" | 630 m || 
|-id=890 bgcolor=#d6d6d6
| 335890 ||  || — || September 11, 2007 || Kitt Peak || Spacewatch || — || align=right | 3.0 km || 
|-id=891 bgcolor=#d6d6d6
| 335891 ||  || — || September 11, 2007 || Purple Mountain || PMO NEO || — || align=right | 3.8 km || 
|-id=892 bgcolor=#d6d6d6
| 335892 ||  || — || September 10, 2007 || Kitt Peak || Spacewatch || — || align=right | 5.1 km || 
|-id=893 bgcolor=#d6d6d6
| 335893 ||  || — || September 10, 2007 || Kitt Peak || Spacewatch || — || align=right | 2.8 km || 
|-id=894 bgcolor=#d6d6d6
| 335894 ||  || — || September 12, 2007 || Kitt Peak || Spacewatch || — || align=right | 2.8 km || 
|-id=895 bgcolor=#d6d6d6
| 335895 ||  || — || September 13, 2007 || Mount Lemmon || Mount Lemmon Survey || THM || align=right | 2.8 km || 
|-id=896 bgcolor=#d6d6d6
| 335896 ||  || — || September 14, 2007 || Mount Lemmon || Mount Lemmon Survey || — || align=right | 2.5 km || 
|-id=897 bgcolor=#d6d6d6
| 335897 ||  || — || September 10, 2007 || Kitt Peak || Spacewatch || — || align=right | 3.9 km || 
|-id=898 bgcolor=#d6d6d6
| 335898 ||  || — || September 10, 2007 || Kitt Peak || Spacewatch || — || align=right | 2.7 km || 
|-id=899 bgcolor=#d6d6d6
| 335899 ||  || — || September 11, 2007 || Mount Lemmon || Mount Lemmon Survey || THM || align=right | 2.5 km || 
|-id=900 bgcolor=#d6d6d6
| 335900 ||  || — || September 13, 2007 || Catalina || CSS || — || align=right | 4.0 km || 
|}

335901–336000 

|-bgcolor=#d6d6d6
| 335901 ||  || — || September 13, 2007 || Anderson Mesa || LONEOS || — || align=right | 2.9 km || 
|-id=902 bgcolor=#d6d6d6
| 335902 ||  || — || September 14, 2007 || Catalina || CSS || — || align=right | 3.7 km || 
|-id=903 bgcolor=#d6d6d6
| 335903 ||  || — || September 12, 2007 || Catalina || CSS || — || align=right | 3.7 km || 
|-id=904 bgcolor=#d6d6d6
| 335904 ||  || — || September 14, 2007 || Mount Lemmon || Mount Lemmon Survey || — || align=right | 4.4 km || 
|-id=905 bgcolor=#d6d6d6
| 335905 ||  || — || September 12, 2007 || Mount Lemmon || Mount Lemmon Survey || — || align=right | 2.3 km || 
|-id=906 bgcolor=#d6d6d6
| 335906 ||  || — || September 13, 2007 || Catalina || CSS || — || align=right | 3.8 km || 
|-id=907 bgcolor=#d6d6d6
| 335907 ||  || — || September 11, 2007 || Kitt Peak || Spacewatch || — || align=right | 3.6 km || 
|-id=908 bgcolor=#d6d6d6
| 335908 ||  || — || September 12, 2007 || Catalina || CSS || — || align=right | 4.1 km || 
|-id=909 bgcolor=#d6d6d6
| 335909 ||  || — || September 9, 2007 || Kitt Peak || Spacewatch || — || align=right | 3.4 km || 
|-id=910 bgcolor=#d6d6d6
| 335910 ||  || — || September 12, 2007 || Mount Lemmon || Mount Lemmon Survey || — || align=right | 4.7 km || 
|-id=911 bgcolor=#d6d6d6
| 335911 ||  || — || September 11, 2007 || Catalina || CSS || — || align=right | 3.2 km || 
|-id=912 bgcolor=#d6d6d6
| 335912 ||  || — || September 11, 2007 || Kitt Peak || Spacewatch || — || align=right | 2.5 km || 
|-id=913 bgcolor=#d6d6d6
| 335913 ||  || — || September 13, 2007 || Mount Lemmon || Mount Lemmon Survey || VER || align=right | 3.4 km || 
|-id=914 bgcolor=#d6d6d6
| 335914 ||  || — || September 15, 2007 || Mount Lemmon || Mount Lemmon Survey || VER || align=right | 3.8 km || 
|-id=915 bgcolor=#d6d6d6
| 335915 ||  || — || September 11, 2007 || Kitt Peak || Spacewatch || — || align=right | 3.3 km || 
|-id=916 bgcolor=#d6d6d6
| 335916 ||  || — || September 19, 2007 || Kitt Peak || Spacewatch || — || align=right | 3.7 km || 
|-id=917 bgcolor=#d6d6d6
| 335917 ||  || — || September 21, 2007 || Kitt Peak || Spacewatch || EOS || align=right | 2.5 km || 
|-id=918 bgcolor=#fefefe
| 335918 ||  || — || September 25, 2007 || Mount Lemmon || Mount Lemmon Survey || H || align=right data-sort-value="0.73" | 730 m || 
|-id=919 bgcolor=#d6d6d6
| 335919 ||  || — || September 30, 2007 || Kitt Peak || Spacewatch || — || align=right | 3.1 km || 
|-id=920 bgcolor=#d6d6d6
| 335920 ||  || — || September 18, 2007 || Catalina || CSS || EOS || align=right | 2.8 km || 
|-id=921 bgcolor=#d6d6d6
| 335921 ||  || — || September 18, 2007 || Catalina || CSS || EOS || align=right | 3.0 km || 
|-id=922 bgcolor=#d6d6d6
| 335922 ||  || — || September 25, 2007 || Mount Lemmon || Mount Lemmon Survey || — || align=right | 3.4 km || 
|-id=923 bgcolor=#d6d6d6
| 335923 ||  || — || October 5, 2007 || Bisei SG Center || BATTeRS || EOS || align=right | 2.4 km || 
|-id=924 bgcolor=#d6d6d6
| 335924 ||  || — || October 6, 2007 || Socorro || LINEAR || — || align=right | 2.6 km || 
|-id=925 bgcolor=#d6d6d6
| 335925 ||  || — || October 6, 2007 || Socorro || LINEAR || THM || align=right | 2.7 km || 
|-id=926 bgcolor=#d6d6d6
| 335926 ||  || — || October 6, 2007 || Socorro || LINEAR || — || align=right | 3.1 km || 
|-id=927 bgcolor=#d6d6d6
| 335927 ||  || — || October 6, 2007 || Dauban || Chante-Perdrix Obs. || — || align=right | 5.1 km || 
|-id=928 bgcolor=#d6d6d6
| 335928 ||  || — || October 7, 2007 || Dauban || Chante-Perdrix Obs. || — || align=right | 3.2 km || 
|-id=929 bgcolor=#d6d6d6
| 335929 ||  || — || October 6, 2007 || Socorro || LINEAR || — || align=right | 3.2 km || 
|-id=930 bgcolor=#d6d6d6
| 335930 ||  || — || October 9, 2007 || Altschwendt || W. Ries || THM || align=right | 2.7 km || 
|-id=931 bgcolor=#fefefe
| 335931 ||  || — || October 9, 2007 || Socorro || LINEAR || H || align=right data-sort-value="0.77" | 770 m || 
|-id=932 bgcolor=#d6d6d6
| 335932 ||  || — || October 4, 2007 || Kitt Peak || Spacewatch || — || align=right | 3.5 km || 
|-id=933 bgcolor=#d6d6d6
| 335933 ||  || — || October 5, 2007 || Siding Spring || SSS || — || align=right | 3.4 km || 
|-id=934 bgcolor=#d6d6d6
| 335934 ||  || — || October 6, 2007 || Kitt Peak || Spacewatch || THM || align=right | 2.2 km || 
|-id=935 bgcolor=#d6d6d6
| 335935 ||  || — || September 9, 2007 || Mount Lemmon || Mount Lemmon Survey || — || align=right | 3.3 km || 
|-id=936 bgcolor=#d6d6d6
| 335936 ||  || — || October 4, 2007 || Kitt Peak || Spacewatch || — || align=right | 3.1 km || 
|-id=937 bgcolor=#d6d6d6
| 335937 ||  || — || October 4, 2007 || Kitt Peak || Spacewatch || — || align=right | 5.2 km || 
|-id=938 bgcolor=#d6d6d6
| 335938 ||  || — || October 4, 2007 || Kitt Peak || Spacewatch || — || align=right | 2.7 km || 
|-id=939 bgcolor=#d6d6d6
| 335939 ||  || — || October 4, 2007 || Kitt Peak || Spacewatch || — || align=right | 4.2 km || 
|-id=940 bgcolor=#d6d6d6
| 335940 ||  || — || October 6, 2007 || Kitt Peak || Spacewatch || — || align=right | 4.0 km || 
|-id=941 bgcolor=#d6d6d6
| 335941 ||  || — || October 7, 2007 || Mount Lemmon || Mount Lemmon Survey || THM || align=right | 3.3 km || 
|-id=942 bgcolor=#d6d6d6
| 335942 ||  || — || October 7, 2007 || Mount Lemmon || Mount Lemmon Survey || — || align=right | 3.4 km || 
|-id=943 bgcolor=#d6d6d6
| 335943 ||  || — || October 10, 2007 || Dauban || Chante-Perdrix Obs. || EOS || align=right | 2.1 km || 
|-id=944 bgcolor=#d6d6d6
| 335944 ||  || — || October 7, 2007 || Catalina || CSS || EOS || align=right | 4.0 km || 
|-id=945 bgcolor=#d6d6d6
| 335945 ||  || — || October 8, 2007 || Catalina || CSS || — || align=right | 4.4 km || 
|-id=946 bgcolor=#fefefe
| 335946 ||  || — || October 14, 2007 || Catalina || CSS || H || align=right data-sort-value="0.64" | 640 m || 
|-id=947 bgcolor=#d6d6d6
| 335947 ||  || — || October 5, 2007 || Kitt Peak || Spacewatch || — || align=right | 3.9 km || 
|-id=948 bgcolor=#d6d6d6
| 335948 ||  || — || October 8, 2007 || Catalina || CSS || EUP || align=right | 6.8 km || 
|-id=949 bgcolor=#d6d6d6
| 335949 ||  || — || October 8, 2007 || Mount Lemmon || Mount Lemmon Survey || HYG || align=right | 3.0 km || 
|-id=950 bgcolor=#d6d6d6
| 335950 ||  || — || October 4, 2007 || Kitt Peak || Spacewatch || — || align=right | 3.1 km || 
|-id=951 bgcolor=#d6d6d6
| 335951 ||  || — || October 6, 2007 || Kitt Peak || Spacewatch || — || align=right | 2.4 km || 
|-id=952 bgcolor=#d6d6d6
| 335952 ||  || — || October 7, 2007 || Catalina || CSS || EUP || align=right | 3.8 km || 
|-id=953 bgcolor=#d6d6d6
| 335953 ||  || — || October 7, 2007 || Catalina || CSS || HYG || align=right | 3.1 km || 
|-id=954 bgcolor=#d6d6d6
| 335954 ||  || — || October 4, 2007 || Kitt Peak || Spacewatch || HYG || align=right | 3.8 km || 
|-id=955 bgcolor=#d6d6d6
| 335955 ||  || — || October 7, 2007 || Catalina || CSS || EOS || align=right | 2.8 km || 
|-id=956 bgcolor=#d6d6d6
| 335956 ||  || — || October 4, 2007 || Kitt Peak || Spacewatch || — || align=right | 2.8 km || 
|-id=957 bgcolor=#d6d6d6
| 335957 ||  || — || October 6, 2007 || Kitt Peak || Spacewatch || THM || align=right | 2.4 km || 
|-id=958 bgcolor=#d6d6d6
| 335958 ||  || — || October 9, 2007 || Kitt Peak || Spacewatch || VER || align=right | 4.5 km || 
|-id=959 bgcolor=#d6d6d6
| 335959 ||  || — || October 6, 2007 || Socorro || LINEAR || — || align=right | 3.4 km || 
|-id=960 bgcolor=#d6d6d6
| 335960 ||  || — || October 9, 2007 || Socorro || LINEAR || EMA || align=right | 5.2 km || 
|-id=961 bgcolor=#d6d6d6
| 335961 ||  || — || October 9, 2007 || Socorro || LINEAR || — || align=right | 2.5 km || 
|-id=962 bgcolor=#d6d6d6
| 335962 ||  || — || October 9, 2007 || Socorro || LINEAR || — || align=right | 3.4 km || 
|-id=963 bgcolor=#d6d6d6
| 335963 ||  || — || October 9, 2007 || Socorro || LINEAR || — || align=right | 3.7 km || 
|-id=964 bgcolor=#d6d6d6
| 335964 ||  || — || October 9, 2007 || Socorro || LINEAR || — || align=right | 3.0 km || 
|-id=965 bgcolor=#d6d6d6
| 335965 ||  || — || October 11, 2007 || Socorro || LINEAR || — || align=right | 2.7 km || 
|-id=966 bgcolor=#d6d6d6
| 335966 ||  || — || October 12, 2007 || Socorro || LINEAR || HYG || align=right | 3.5 km || 
|-id=967 bgcolor=#d6d6d6
| 335967 ||  || — || October 12, 2007 || Socorro || LINEAR || — || align=right | 4.8 km || 
|-id=968 bgcolor=#d6d6d6
| 335968 Xiejin ||  ||  || September 21, 2007 || XuYi || PMO NEO || TIR || align=right | 4.7 km || 
|-id=969 bgcolor=#d6d6d6
| 335969 ||  || — || October 4, 2007 || Catalina || CSS || — || align=right | 3.1 km || 
|-id=970 bgcolor=#d6d6d6
| 335970 ||  || — || October 9, 2007 || Purple Mountain || PMO NEO || — || align=right | 3.9 km || 
|-id=971 bgcolor=#d6d6d6
| 335971 ||  || — || October 7, 2007 || Mount Lemmon || Mount Lemmon Survey || — || align=right | 3.1 km || 
|-id=972 bgcolor=#d6d6d6
| 335972 ||  || — || August 24, 2007 || Kitt Peak || Spacewatch || VER || align=right | 3.0 km || 
|-id=973 bgcolor=#d6d6d6
| 335973 ||  || — || October 10, 2007 || Catalina || CSS || — || align=right | 5.2 km || 
|-id=974 bgcolor=#d6d6d6
| 335974 ||  || — || October 7, 2007 || Kitt Peak || Spacewatch || HYG || align=right | 3.0 km || 
|-id=975 bgcolor=#d6d6d6
| 335975 ||  || — || October 10, 2007 || Kitt Peak || Spacewatch || — || align=right | 3.6 km || 
|-id=976 bgcolor=#E9E9E9
| 335976 ||  || — || September 21, 2003 || Kitt Peak || Spacewatch || GEF || align=right | 1.7 km || 
|-id=977 bgcolor=#d6d6d6
| 335977 ||  || — || October 11, 2007 || Catalina || CSS || — || align=right | 3.2 km || 
|-id=978 bgcolor=#d6d6d6
| 335978 ||  || — || October 8, 2007 || Catalina || CSS || — || align=right | 4.0 km || 
|-id=979 bgcolor=#d6d6d6
| 335979 ||  || — || October 8, 2007 || Kitt Peak || Spacewatch || — || align=right | 2.6 km || 
|-id=980 bgcolor=#d6d6d6
| 335980 ||  || — || October 10, 2007 || Kitt Peak || Spacewatch || — || align=right | 3.4 km || 
|-id=981 bgcolor=#d6d6d6
| 335981 ||  || — || October 14, 2007 || Socorro || LINEAR || — || align=right | 3.2 km || 
|-id=982 bgcolor=#d6d6d6
| 335982 ||  || — || October 14, 2007 || Socorro || LINEAR || EOS || align=right | 2.6 km || 
|-id=983 bgcolor=#d6d6d6
| 335983 ||  || — || October 14, 2007 || Socorro || LINEAR || — || align=right | 3.5 km || 
|-id=984 bgcolor=#d6d6d6
| 335984 ||  || — || October 10, 2007 || Anderson Mesa || LONEOS || — || align=right | 4.1 km || 
|-id=985 bgcolor=#d6d6d6
| 335985 ||  || — || October 10, 2007 || Anderson Mesa || LONEOS || EOS || align=right | 2.9 km || 
|-id=986 bgcolor=#d6d6d6
| 335986 ||  || — || October 10, 2007 || Kitt Peak || Spacewatch || EOS || align=right | 2.8 km || 
|-id=987 bgcolor=#d6d6d6
| 335987 ||  || — || October 9, 2007 || Kitt Peak || Spacewatch || — || align=right | 2.4 km || 
|-id=988 bgcolor=#d6d6d6
| 335988 ||  || — || October 10, 2007 || Mount Lemmon || Mount Lemmon Survey || — || align=right | 3.4 km || 
|-id=989 bgcolor=#d6d6d6
| 335989 ||  || — || October 11, 2007 || Mount Lemmon || Mount Lemmon Survey || EOS || align=right | 2.5 km || 
|-id=990 bgcolor=#d6d6d6
| 335990 ||  || — || October 12, 2007 || Kitt Peak || Spacewatch || — || align=right | 2.6 km || 
|-id=991 bgcolor=#d6d6d6
| 335991 ||  || — || October 9, 2007 || Mount Lemmon || Mount Lemmon Survey || — || align=right | 2.7 km || 
|-id=992 bgcolor=#d6d6d6
| 335992 ||  || — || October 13, 2007 || Catalina || CSS || — || align=right | 3.2 km || 
|-id=993 bgcolor=#d6d6d6
| 335993 ||  || — || October 11, 2007 || Kitt Peak || Spacewatch || HYG || align=right | 3.2 km || 
|-id=994 bgcolor=#d6d6d6
| 335994 ||  || — || October 10, 2007 || Catalina || CSS || — || align=right | 3.0 km || 
|-id=995 bgcolor=#d6d6d6
| 335995 ||  || — || April 24, 1995 || Kitt Peak || Spacewatch || — || align=right | 3.5 km || 
|-id=996 bgcolor=#d6d6d6
| 335996 ||  || — || October 10, 2007 || Kitt Peak || Spacewatch || EOS || align=right | 2.9 km || 
|-id=997 bgcolor=#d6d6d6
| 335997 ||  || — || October 11, 2007 || Catalina || CSS || — || align=right | 3.7 km || 
|-id=998 bgcolor=#d6d6d6
| 335998 ||  || — || October 11, 2007 || Catalina || CSS || — || align=right | 3.0 km || 
|-id=999 bgcolor=#d6d6d6
| 335999 ||  || — || October 11, 2007 || Catalina || CSS || — || align=right | 3.6 km || 
|-id=000 bgcolor=#d6d6d6
| 336000 ||  || — || October 12, 2007 || Kitt Peak || Spacewatch || EOS || align=right | 2.2 km || 
|}

References

External links 
 Discovery Circumstances: Numbered Minor Planets (335001)–(340000) (IAU Minor Planet Center)

0335